= Affoltern =

Affoltern may refer to the following places in Switzerland:

- Affoltern am Albis, in the Canton of Zürich
- Affoltern im Emmental, in the Canton of Bern
- Affoltern (Zürich), part of the city of Zürich
- Grossaffoltern, in the Canton of Bern
