= Messen =

- Municipality
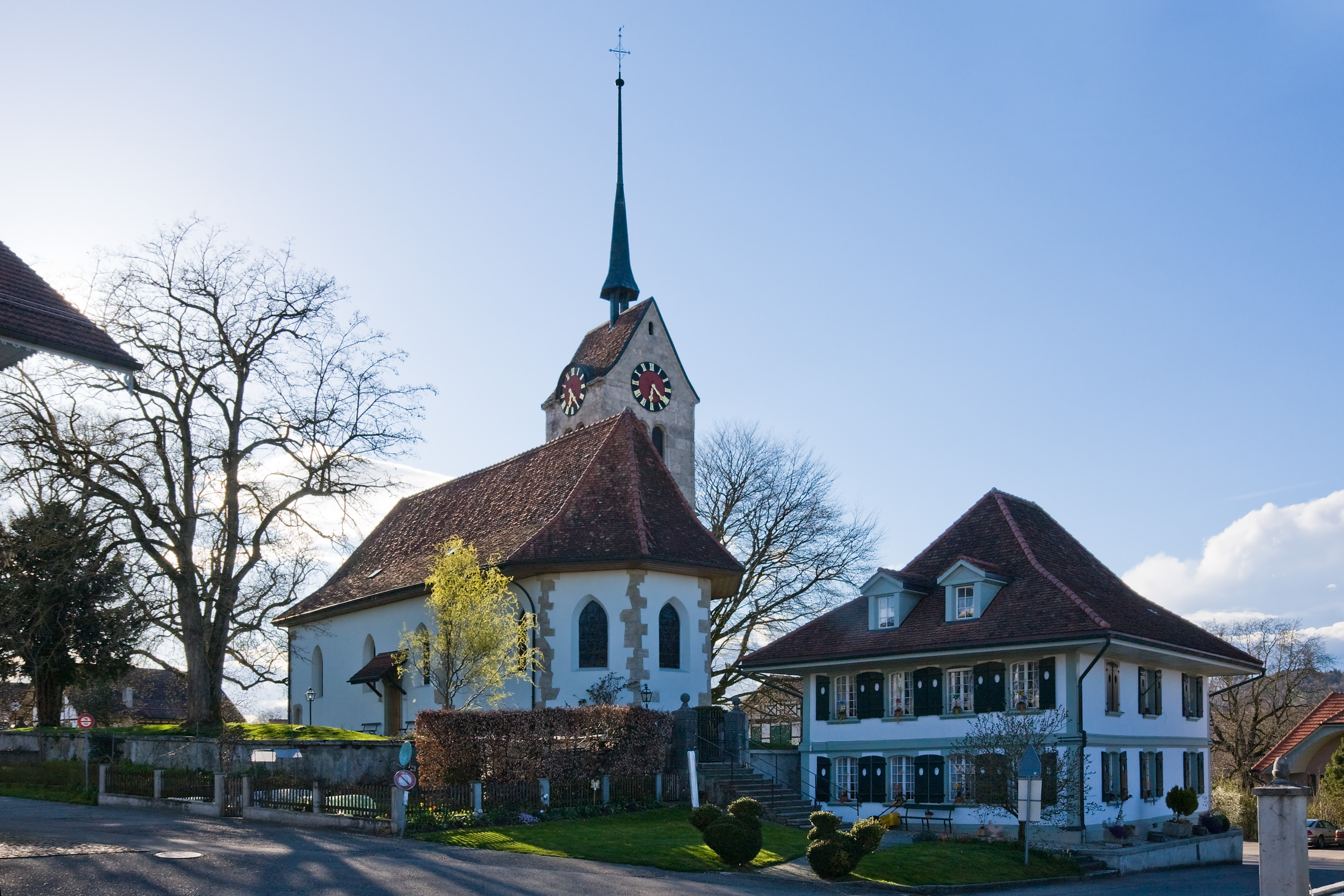
- Messen village

- Coat of arms
- Location of Messen
- Location within Switzerland Location within Canton of Solothurn
- Coordinates: 47°6′N 7°27′E
- Country: Switzerland
- Canton: Solothurn
- District: Bucheggberg

Area
  - Total: 7.08 km^{2} (2.73 sq mi)
- Elevation: 505 m (1,657 ft)

Population (December 2020)
  - Total: 1,471
  - Density: 208/km^{2} (538/sq mi)
- Time zone: UTC+01:00 (CET)
  - Summer (DST): UTC+02:00 (CEST)
- Postal code: 3254
- SFOS number: 2457
- ISO 3166 code: CH-SO
- Surrounded by: Balm bei Messen, Brunnenthal, Etzelkofen (BE), Mülchi (BE), Oberramsern, Rapperswil (BE), Ruppoldsried (BE), Scheunen (BE)
- Website: www.messen.ch

Messen is a municipality in the district of Bucheggberg, in the canton of Solothurn, Switzerland. On 1 January 2010 the municipalities of Balm bei Messen, Brunnenthal and Oberramsern merged into the municipality of Messen.

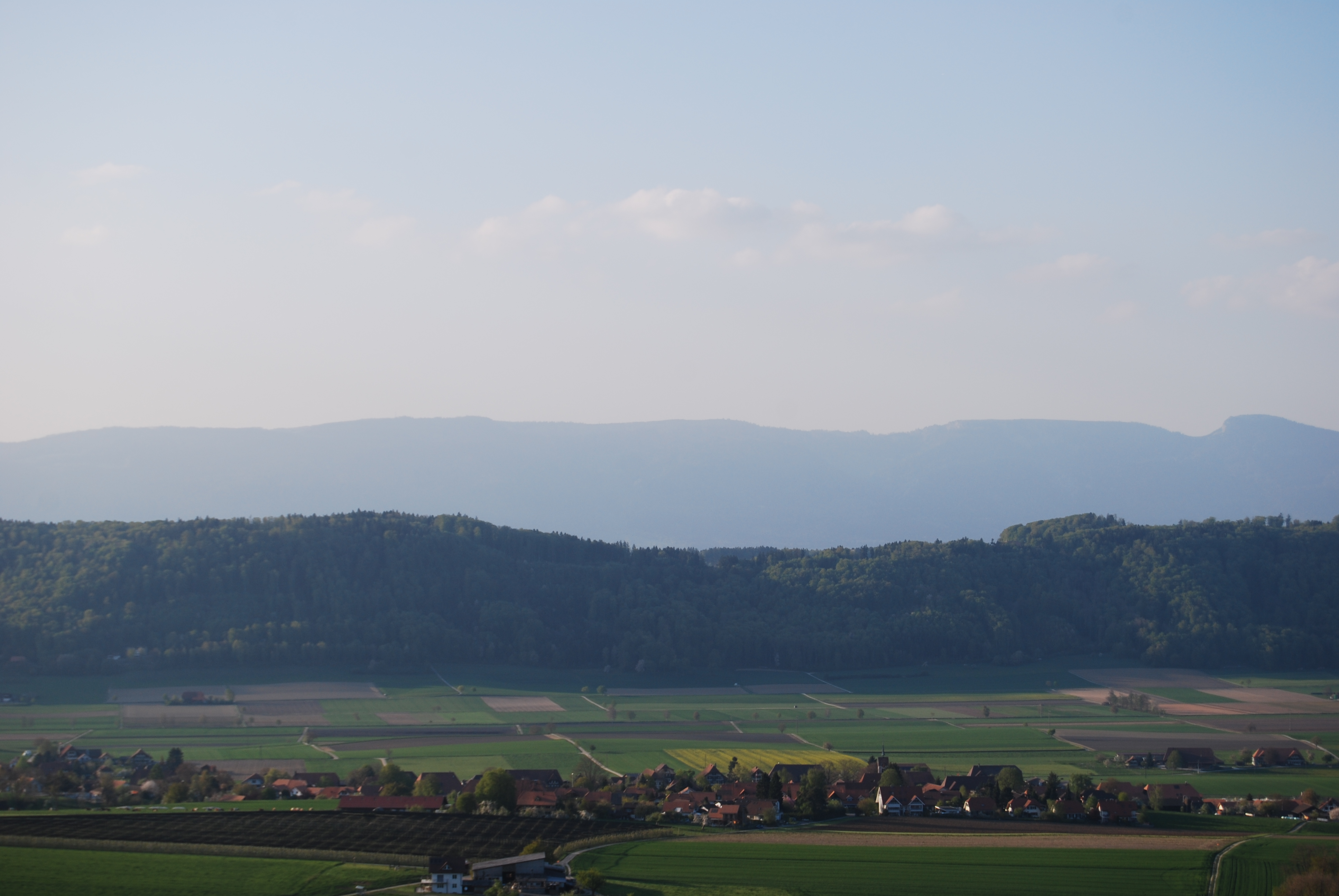
Messen

== History ==
Messen is first mentioned in 1223 as Messon. Balm bei Messen is first mentioned in 1254 as de Balmo. In 1275 it was mentioned as in Balm. Brunnenthal is first mentioned in 1387 as Wernher von Brunnental. In 1396 it was mentioned as Brunental. Oberramsern is first mentioned in 1276 as Rambsern though this comes from a 17th-century copy of the original. In 1318 it was mentioned as Ramserron superiori.

== Geography ==
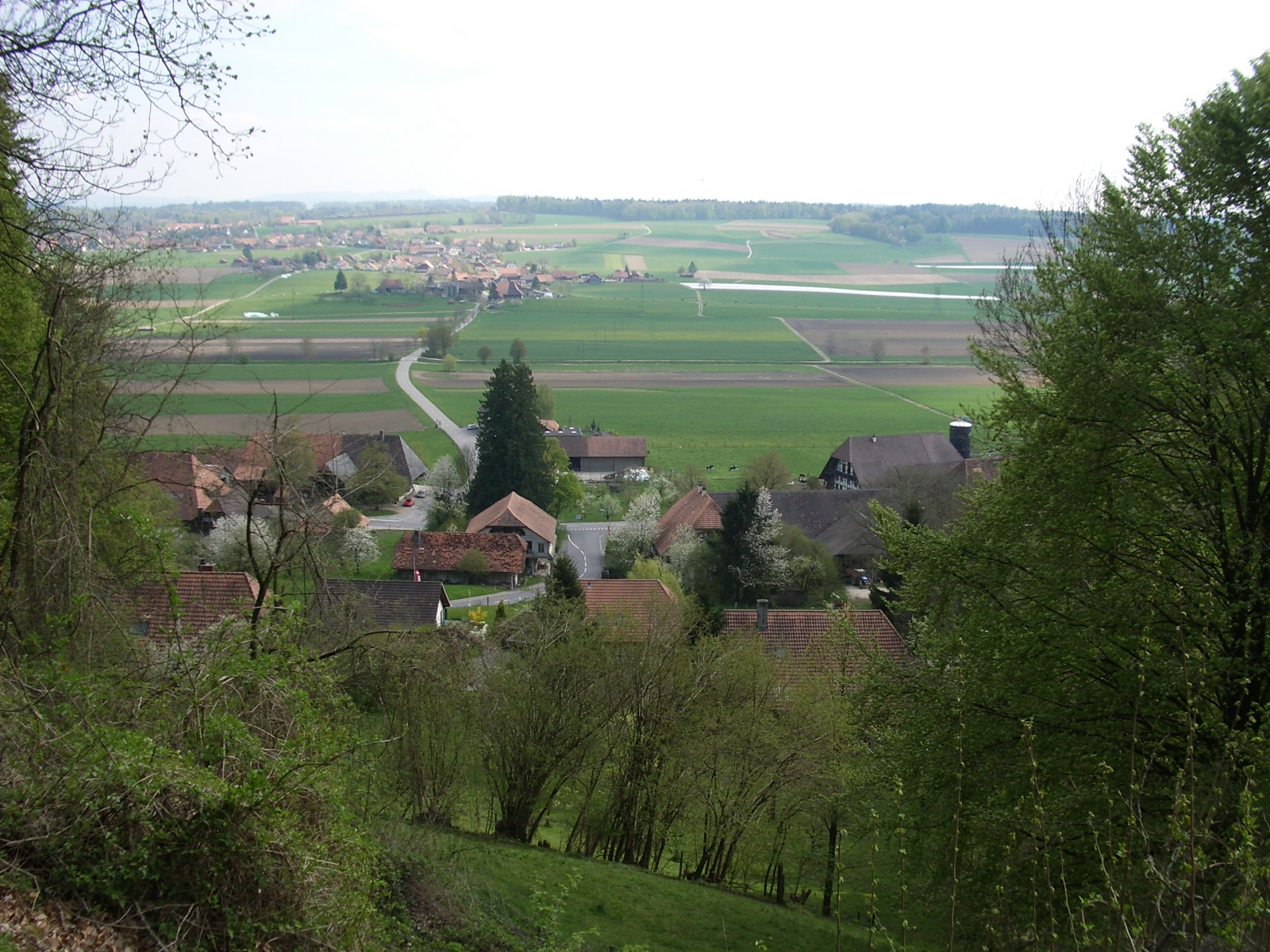
Village of Balm bei Messen

Aerial view from 300 m by Walter Mittelholzer (1922)

Messen has an area, as of 2009, of 7.08 square kilometers (2.73 sq mi). Of this area, 4.46 km^{2} (1.72 sq mi) or 63.0% is used for agricultural purposes, while 2.07 km^{2} (0.80 sq mi) or 29.2% is forested. Of the rest of the land, 0.49 km^{2} (0.19 sq mi) or 6.9% is settled (buildings or roads), 0.03 km^{2} (7.4 acres) or 0.4% is either rivers or lakes.

Of the built up area, housing and buildings made up 3.8% and transportation infrastructure made up 2.1%. Out of the forested land, all of the forested land area is covered with heavy forests. Of the agricultural land, 50.0% is used for growing crops and 10.9% is pastures, while 2.1% is used for orchards or vine crops. All the water in the municipality is flowing water.

The municipality is located in the Bucheggberg district, in the hill country south of the Limpach valley. It consists of the haufendorf village (an irregular, unplanned and quite closely packed village, built around a central square) of Messen and the hamlets of Eichholz and Niderwol. It now also includes the former independent municipalities of Balm bei Messen, Brunnenthal and Oberramsern.

== Coat of arms ==
The blazon of the municipal coat of arms is Azure a House with two Towers embattled all Argent.

== Demographics ==
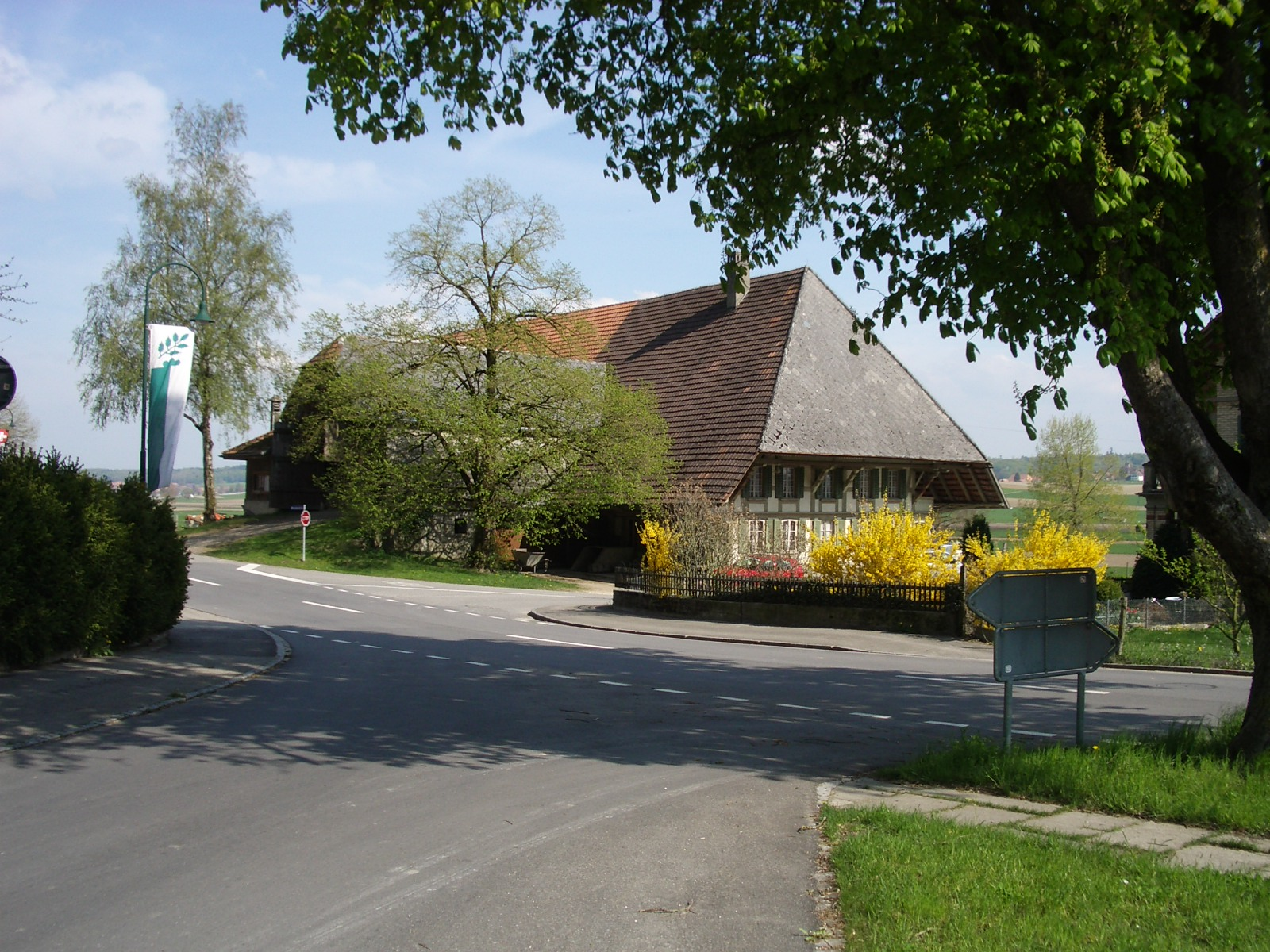
Balm bei Messen village

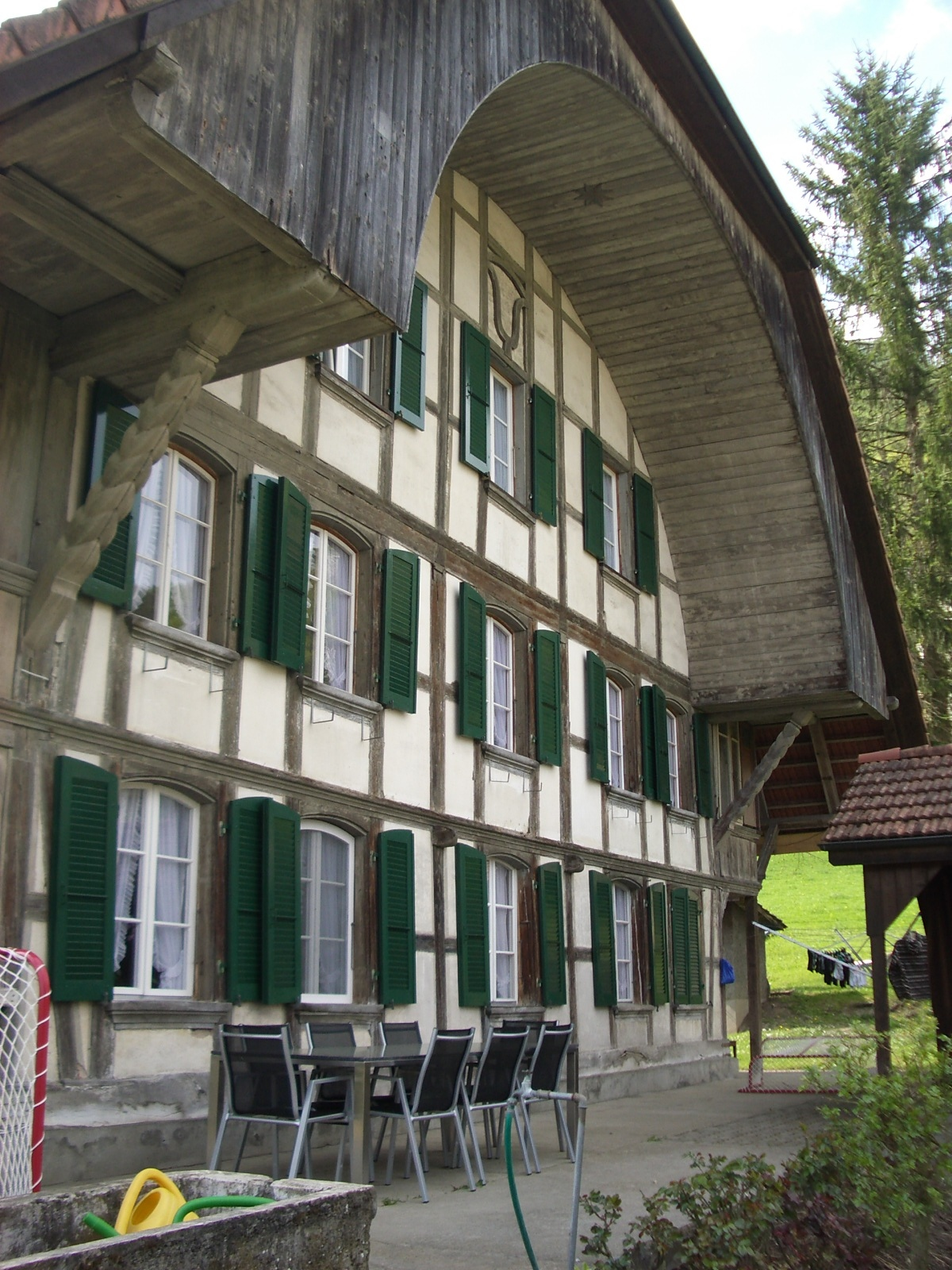
House in Balm bei Messen

Messen has a population (as of December 2020) of 1,471. As of 2008, 2.9% of the population are resident foreign nationals. Over the last 10 years (1999–2009 ) the population has changed at a rate of 3.5%.

Most of the population (as of 2000) speaks German (945 or 97.6%), with French being second most common (10 or 1.0%) and Portuguese being third (3 or 0.3%).

As of 2008, the gender distribution of the population was 52.4% male and 47.6% female. The population was made up of 521 Swiss men (49.5% of the population) and 30 (2.9%) non-Swiss men. There were 479 Swiss women (45.5%) and 22 (2.1%) non-Swiss women. Of the population in the municipality 350 or about 36.2% were born in Messen and lived there in 2000. There were 112 or 11.6% who were born in the same canton, while 442 or 45.7% were born somewhere else in Switzerland, and 37 or 3.8% were born outside of Switzerland.

In 2008 there were 9 live births to Swiss citizens and were 4 deaths of Swiss citizens. Ignoring immigration and emigration, the population of Swiss citizens increased by 5 while the foreign population remained the same. There were 2 Swiss men who emigrated from Switzerland and 1 Swiss woman who immigrated back to Switzerland. At the same time, there were 2 non-Swiss men and 2 non-Swiss women who immigrated from another country to Switzerland. The total Swiss population change in 2008 (from all sources, including moves across municipal borders) was an increase of 3 and the non-Swiss population increased by 1 people. This represents a population growth rate of 0.4%.

The age distribution, as of 2000, in Messen is; 98 children or 10.1% of the population are between 0 and 6 years old and 158 teenagers or 16.3% are between 7 and 19. Of the adult population, 39 people or 4.0% of the population are between 20 and 24 years old. 343 people or 35.4% are between 25 and 44, and 205 people or 21.2% are between 45 and 64. The senior population distribution is 96 people or 9.9% of the population are between 65 and 79 years old and there are 29 people or 3.0% who are over 80.

As of 2000, there were 408 people who were single and never married in the municipality. There were 507 married individuals, 25 widows or widowers and 28 individuals who are divorced.

As of 2000, there were 512 private households in the municipality, and an average of 2.6 persons per household. There were 69 households that consist of only one person and 30 households with five or more people. Out of a total of 371 households that answered this question, 18.6% were households made up of just one person and there were 4 adults who lived with their parents. Of the rest of the households, there are 118 married couples without children, 147 married couples with children There were 20 single parents with a child or children. There were 4 households that were made up of unrelated people and 9 households that were made up of some sort of institution or another collective housing.

In 2000 there were 155 single family homes (or 59.6% of the total) out of a total of 260 inhabited buildings. There were 33 multi-family buildings (12.7%), along with 58 multi-purpose buildings that were mostly used for housing (22.3%) and 14 other use buildings (commercial or industrial) that also had some housing (5.4%). Of the single family homes 21 were built before 1919, while 42 were built between 1990 and 2000. The greatest number of single family homes (31) were built between 1981 and 1990.

In 2000 there were 360 apartments in the municipality. The most common apartment size was 4 rooms of which there were 97. There were 4 single room apartments and 168 apartments with five or more rooms. Of these apartments, a total of 347 apartments (96.4% of the total) were permanently occupied, while 6 apartments (1.7%) were seasonally occupied and 7 apartments (1.9%) were empty. As of 2009, the construction rate of new housing units was 0 new units per 1000 residents. The vacancy rate for the municipality, in 2010, was 0%.

== Historic Population ==
The historical population is given in the following chart:

== Politics ==
In the 2007 federal election the most popular party was the FDP which received 33.76% of the vote. The next three most popular parties were the SVP (29.46%), the SP (19.13%) and the Green Party (7.79%). In the federal election, a total of 389 votes were cast, and the voter turnout was 51.6%.

== Economy ==
As of 2010, Messen had an unemployment rate of 0.8%. As of 2008, there were 116 people employed in the primary economic sector and about 44 businesses involved in this sector. 55 people were employed in the secondary sector and there were 11 businesses in this sector. 224 people were employed in the tertiary sector, with 49 businesses in this sector. There were 531 residents of the municipality who were employed in some capacity, of which females made up 42.2% of the workforce.

In 2008 the total number of full-time equivalent jobs was 235. The number of jobs in the primary sector was 46, all of which were in agriculture. The number of jobs in the secondary sector was 38 of which 17 or (44.7%) were in manufacturing and 21 (55.3%) were in construction. The number of jobs in the tertiary sector was 151. In the tertiary sector; 49 or 32.5% were in wholesale or retail sales or the repair of motor vehicles, 32 or 21.2% were in the movement and storage of goods, 10 or 6.6% were in a hotel or restaurant, 6 or 4.0% were in the information industry, 1 was the insurance or financial industry, 12 or 7.9% were technical professionals or scientists, 30 or 19.9% were in education and 6 or 4.0% were in health care.

In 2000, there were 116 workers who commuted into the municipality and 335 workers who commuted away. The municipality is a net exporter of workers, with about 2.9 workers leaving the municipality for every one entering. Of the working population, 9.8% used public transportation to get to work, and 56.1% used a private car.

== Religion ==
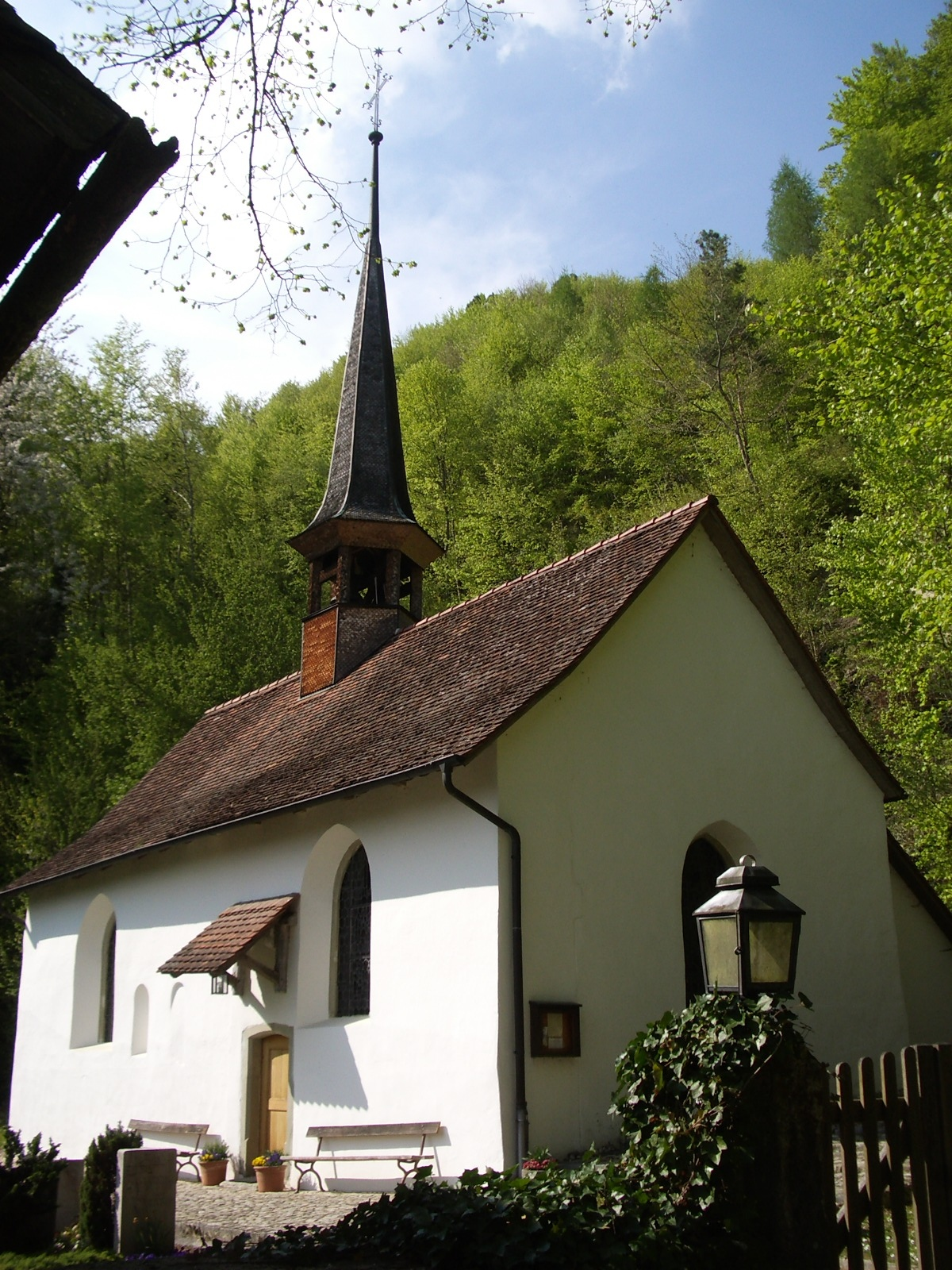
Church in Balm bei Messen

From the 2000 census, 92 or 9.5% were Roman Catholic, while 795 or 82.1% belonged to the Swiss Reformed Church. Of the rest of the population, there were 3 members of an Orthodox church (or about 0.31% of the population), there were 2 individuals (or about 0.21% of the population) who belonged to the Christian Catholic Church, and there were 3 individuals (or about 0.31% of the population) who belonged to another Christian church. There was 1 individual who was Islamic. 49 (or about 5.06% of the population) belonged to no church, are agnostic or atheist, and 23 individuals (or about 2.38% of the population) did not answer the question.

== Education ==
In Messen about 385 or (39.8%) of the population have completed non-mandatory upper secondary education, and 162 or (16.7%) have completed additional higher education (either university or a Fachhochschule). Of the 162 who completed tertiary schooling, 73.5% were Swiss men, 24.7% were Swiss women.

As of 2000, there were 90 students in Messen who came from another municipality, while 33 residents attended schools outside the municipality.
