= Ruppoldsried =

- Former municipality
- Flag Coat of arms
- Location of Ruppoldsried
- Location within Switzerland Location within Canton of Bern
- Coordinates: 47°5′N 7°26′E
- Country: Switzerland
- Canton: Bern
- District: Seeland

Area
  - Total: 2.2 km^{2} (0.85 sq mi)
- Elevation: 490 m (1,610 ft)

Population (Dec 2011)
  - Total: 259
  - Density: 120/km^{2} (300/sq mi)
- Time zone: UTC+01:00 (CET)
  - Summer (DST): UTC+02:00 (CEST)
- Postal code: 3251
- SFOS number: 548
- ISO 3166 code: CH-BE
- Surrounded by: Balm bei Messen (SO), Messen (SO), Rapperswil, Wengi
- Website: ruppoldsried.ch

Ruppoldsried is a former municipality in the Seeland administrative district in the canton of Bern in Switzerland. On 1 January 2013 Ruppoldsried merged into Rapperswil.

== History ==
Ruppoldsried is first mentioned in 1279 as Ruopolsriet.

During the Late Middle Ages the village was owned by the von Ergeuw family from Burgdorf. The family is mentioned in 1373 during a dispute over land use near the village. At some time before 1506, Konrad von Ergeuw sold the village to Bern. Under Bernese control Ruppoldsried was placed under the control and low court of Mülchi. It was part of the high court of Zollikofen.

The residents were part of the parish of Messen in Solothurn. In the 16th century, when Messen embraced the Protestant Reformation and adopted the Reformed faith, Ruppoldsried followed.

Beginning in the 19th century local farmers began to raise dairy cattle along with traditional agriculture. The village dairy was built in 1884. Today Ruppoldsried and Messen form an intercantonal school district. The village has regular Postauto service from Bern and Lyss. It has retained much of its rural, agrarian character, today nearly two thirds of all jobs in Ruppoldsried are in agriculture.

== Geography ==
Ruppoldsried had an area of 2.2 km^{2} (0.85 sq mi). Of this area, 1.74 km^{2} (0.67 mi^{2}) or 79.1% is used for agricultural purposes, while 0.27 km^{2} (0.10 mi^{2}) or 12.3% is forested. Of the rest of the land, 0.13 km^{2} (32 acres) or 5.9% is settled (buildings or roads), 0.04 km^{2} (9.9 acres) or 1.8% is either rivers or lakes.

Of the built up area, housing and buildings made up 4.1% and transportation infrastructure made up 1.8%. Out of the forested land, all of the forested land area is covered with heavy forests. Of the agricultural land, 66.4% is used for growing crops and 12.7% is pastures. All the water in the municipality is flowing water.

The former municipality is located in the Limpach valley on the border with the Canton of Solothurn. It consists of the village of Ruppoldsried and part of the settlement of Eichholz (the rest is part of the municipality of Messen in Solothurn).

On 31 December 2009 Amtsbezirk Fraubrunnen, the municipality's former district, was dissolved. On the following day, 1 January 2010, it joined the newly created Verwaltungskreis Seeland.

== Coat of arms ==
The blazon of the municipal coat of arms is Per fess Or a Lion passant Gules and Azure a Castle embatteled Argent.

== Demographics ==
Ruppoldsried has a population (as of December 2020) of 262. As of 2010, 2.7% of the population are resident foreign nationals. Over the last 10 years (2000–2010) the population has changed at a rate of -0.4%. Migration accounted for -2.7%, while births and deaths accounted for 1.5%.

Most of the population (as of 2000) speaks German (246 or 98.0%) as their first language, French is the second most common (4 or 1.6%) and Portuguese is the third (1 or 0.4%).

As of 2008, the population was 49.2% male and 50.8% female. The population was made up of 124 Swiss men (47.7% of the population) and 4 (1.5%) non-Swiss men. There were 129 Swiss women (49.6%) and 3 (1.2%) non-Swiss women. Of the population in the municipality, 113 or about 45.0% were born in Ruppoldsried and lived there in 2000. There were 90 or 35.9% who were born in the same canton, while 37 or 14.7% were born somewhere else in Switzerland, and 9 or 3.6% were born outside of Switzerland.

As of 2010, children and teenagers (0–19 years old) make up 25.4% of the population, while adults (20–64 years old) make up 66.2% and seniors (over 64 years old) make up 8.5%.

As of 2000, there were 119 people who were single and never married in the municipality. There were 114 married individuals, 12 widows or widowers and 6 individuals who are divorced.

As of 2000, there were 23 households that consist of only one person and 8 households with five or more people. In 2000, a total of 81 apartments (95.3% of the total) were permanently occupied, while 4 apartments (4.7%) were seasonally occupied. As of 2010, the construction rate of new housing units was 3.8 new units per 1000 residents. The vacancy rate for the municipality, in 2011, was 0.97%.

The historical population is given in the following chart:

== Politics ==
In the 2011 federal election the most popular party was the Swiss People's Party (SVP) which received 45.8% of the vote. The next two most popular parties were the Conservative Democratic Party (BDP) (19.8%), and the Social Democratic Party (SP) (16.2%) . In the federal election, a total of 72 votes were cast, and the voter turnout was 35.3%.

== Economy ==
As of 2011, Ruppoldsried had an unemployment rate of 1.08%. As of 2008, there were a total of 47 people employed in the municipality. Of these, there were 30 people employed in the primary economic sector and about 12 businesses involved in this sector. 7 people were employed in the secondary sector and there were 3 businesses in this sector. 10 people were employed in the tertiary sector, with 3 businesses in this sector. There were 128 residents of the municipality who were employed in some capacity, of which females made up 39.8% of the workforce.

In 2008 there were a total of 32 full-time equivalent jobs. The number of jobs in the primary sector was 20, all of which were in agriculture. The number of jobs in the secondary sector was 6 of which 3 or (50.0%) were in manufacturing and 3 (50.0%) were in construction. The number of jobs in the tertiary sector was 6. In the tertiary sector; 3 were in a hotel or restaurant and 3 were in education.

In 2000, there were 3 workers who commuted into the municipality and 105 workers who commuted away. The municipality is a net exporter of workers, with about 35.0 workers leaving the municipality for every one entering. Of the working population, 13.3% used public transportation to get to work, and 62.5% used a private car.

== Religion ==
From the 2000 census, 17 or 6.8% were Roman Catholic, while 217 or 86.5% belonged to the Swiss Reformed Church. Of the rest of the population, there was 1 individual who belongs to another Christian church. There were 2 individuals who belonged to another church. 8 (or about 3.19% of the population) belonged to no church, are agnostic or atheist, and 6 individuals (or about 2.39% of the population) did not answer the question.

== Education ==
In Ruppoldsried about 102 or (40.6%) of the population have completed non-mandatory upper secondary education, and 22 or (8.8%) have completed additional higher education (either university or a Fachhochschule). Of the 22 who completed tertiary schooling, 77.3% were Swiss men, 22.7% were Swiss women.

The Canton of Bern school system provides one year of non-obligatory Kindergarten, followed by six years of Primary school. This is followed by three years of obligatory lower Secondary school where the students are separated according to ability and aptitude. Following the lower Secondary students may attend additional schooling or they may enter an apprenticeship.

During the 2010–11 school year, there were a total of 19 students attending classes in Ruppoldsried. There were no kindergarten classes in the municipality. The municipality had 2 primary classes and 19 students.

As of 2000, there was one student in Ruppoldsried who came from another municipality, while 14 residents attended schools outside the municipality.
