= Unterramsern =

- Municipality

- Coat of arms
- Location of Unterramsern
- Location within Switzerland Location within Canton of Solothurn
- Coordinates: 47°7′N 7°29′E
- Country: Switzerland
- Canton: Solothurn
- District: Bucheggberg

Government
  - Mayor: Gemeindepräsident

Area
  - Total: 1.56 km^{2} (0.60 sq mi)
- Elevation: 475 m (1,558 ft)

Population (December 2020)
  - Total: 219
  - Density: 140/km^{2} (364/sq mi)
- Time zone: UTC+01:00 (CET)
  - Summer (DST): UTC+02:00 (CEST)
- Postal code: 4588
- SFOS number: 2463
- ISO 3166 code: CH-SO
- Surrounded by: Aetigkofen, Aetingen, Limpach (BE), Mühledorf, Mülchi (BE), Oberramsern
- Website: www.unterramsern.ch

Unterramsern is a municipality in the district of Bucheggberg, in the canton of Solothurn, Switzerland.

== Geography ==
Unterramsern has an area, as of 2009, of 1.56 square kilometers (0.60 sq mi). Of this area, 0.97 km^{2} (0.37 sq mi) or 62.2% is used for agricultural purposes, while 0.45 km^{2} (0.17 sq mi) or 28.8% is forested. Of the rest of the land, 0.11 km^{2} (27 acres) or 7.1% is settled (buildings or roads), 0.01 km^{2} (2.5 acres) or 0.6% is either rivers or lakes.

Of the built up area, housing and buildings made up 5.8% and transportation infrastructure made up 0.6%. Out of the forested land, all of the forested land area is covered with heavy forests. Of the agricultural land, 47.4% is used for growing crops and 14.7% is pastures. All the water in the municipality is flowing water.

== Coat of arms ==
The blazon of the municipal coat of arms is Per fess Gules and Argent a Bear's Garlic flower between six roundels counterchanged.

== Demographics ==
Unterramsern has a population (as of December 2020) of 219. As of 2008, 5.9% of the population are resident foreign nationals. Over the last 10 years (1999–2009 ) the population has changed at a rate of 17.3%.

Most of the population (as of 2000) speaks German (173 or 98.9%) with the rest speaking French

As of 2008, the gender distribution of the population was 50.7% male and 49.3% female. The population was made up of 101 Swiss men (47.0% of the population) and 8 (3.7%) non-Swiss men. There were 100 Swiss women (46.5%) and 6 (2.8%) non-Swiss women. Of the population in the municipality 52 or about 29.7% were born in Unterramsern and lived there in 2000. There were 41 or 23.4% who were born in the same canton, while 76 or 43.4% were born somewhere else in Switzerland, and 3 or 1.7% were born outside of Switzerland.

In 2008 there was 1 live birth to Swiss citizens and 1 death of a Swiss citizen. Ignoring immigration and emigration, the population of Swiss citizens remained the same while the foreign population remained the same. There was 1 Swiss man who immigrated back to Switzerland. The total Swiss population change in 2008 (from all sources, including moves across municipal borders) was an increase of 10 and the non-Swiss population remained the same. This represents a population growth rate of 5.1%.

The age distribution, as of 2000, in Unterramsern is; 16 children or 9.1% of the population are between 0 and 6 years old and 40 teenagers or 22.9% are between 7 and 19. Of the adult population, 9 people or 5.1% of the population are between 20 and 24 years old. 59 people or 33.7% are between 25 and 44, and 36 people or 20.6% are between 45 and 64. The senior population distribution is 11 people or 6.3% of the population are between 65 and 79 years old and there are 4 people or 2.3% who are over 80.

As of 2000, there were 84 people who were single and never married in the municipality. There were 74 married individuals, 5 widows or widowers and 12 individuals who are divorced.

As of 2000, there were 61 private households in the municipality, and an average of 2.9 persons per household. There were 10 households that consist of only one person and 12 households with five or more people. Out of a total of 61 households that answered this question, 16.4% were households made up of just one person and there were 1 adults who lived with their parents. Of the rest of the households, there are 21 married couples without children, 24 married couples with children There were 4 single parents with a child or children. There was 1 household that was made up of unrelated people.

In 2000 there were 30 single family homes (or 52.6% of the total) out of a total of 57 inhabited buildings. There were 5 multi-family buildings (8.8%), along with 20 multi-purpose buildings that were mostly used for housing (35.1%) and 2 other use buildings (commercial or industrial) that also had some housing (3.5%). Of the single family homes 12 were built before 1919, while 6 were built between 1990 and 2000.

In 2000 there were 64 apartments in the municipality. The most common apartment size was 3 rooms of which there were 16. There were 1 single room apartment and 36 apartments with five or more rooms. Of these apartments, a total of 60 apartments (93.8% of the total) were permanently occupied, while 2 apartments (3.1%) were seasonally occupied and 2 apartments (3.1%) were empty. As of 2009, the construction rate of new housing units was 9.5 new units per 1000 residents. The vacancy rate for the municipality, in 2010, was 0%.

The historical population is given in the following chart:

== Politics ==
In the 2007 federal election the most popular party was the FDP which received 42.91% of the vote. The next three most popular parties were the SVP (20.52%), the CVP (19.03%) and the SP (12.31%). In the federal election, a total of 77 votes were cast, and the voter turnout was 52.0%.

== Economy ==
As of 2010, Unterramsern had an unemployment rate of 3.6%. As of 2008, there were 18 people employed in the primary economic sector and about 8 businesses involved in this sector. 22 people were employed in the secondary sector and there were 4 businesses in this sector. 18 people were employed in the tertiary sector, with 7 businesses in this sector. There were 103 residents of the municipality who were employed in some capacity, of which females made up 40.8% of the workforce.

In 2008 the total number of full-time equivalent jobs was 47. The number of jobs in the primary sector was 14, all of which were in agriculture. The number of jobs in the secondary sector was 18 of which 2 or (11.1%) were in manufacturing and 17 (94.4%) were in construction. The number of jobs in the tertiary sector was 15. In the tertiary sector; 1 was in the sale or repair of motor vehicles, 10 or 66.7% were in the movement and storage of goods, 2 or 13.3% were in a hotel or restaurant, .

In 2000, there were 9 workers who commuted into the municipality and 68 workers who commuted away. The municipality is a net exporter of workers, with about 7.6 workers leaving the municipality for every one entering. Of the working population, 5.8% used public transportation to get to work, and 58.3% used a private car.

== Religion ==
From the 2000 census, 24 or 13.7% were Roman Catholic, while 133 or 76.0% belonged to the Swiss Reformed Church. Of the rest of the population, there was 1 member of an Orthodox church. 15 (or about 8.57% of the population) belonged to no church, are agnostic or atheist, and 2 individuals (or about 1.14% of the population) did not answer the question.

== Education ==
In Unterramsern about 83 or (47.4%) of the population have completed non-mandatory upper secondary education, and 23 or (13.1%) have completed additional higher education (either university or a Fachhochschule). Of the 23 who completed tertiary schooling, 69.6% were Swiss men, 30.4% were Swiss women.

As of 2000, there were 38 students from Unterramsern who attended schools outside the municipality.
