= Balm bei Messen =

- Former municipality
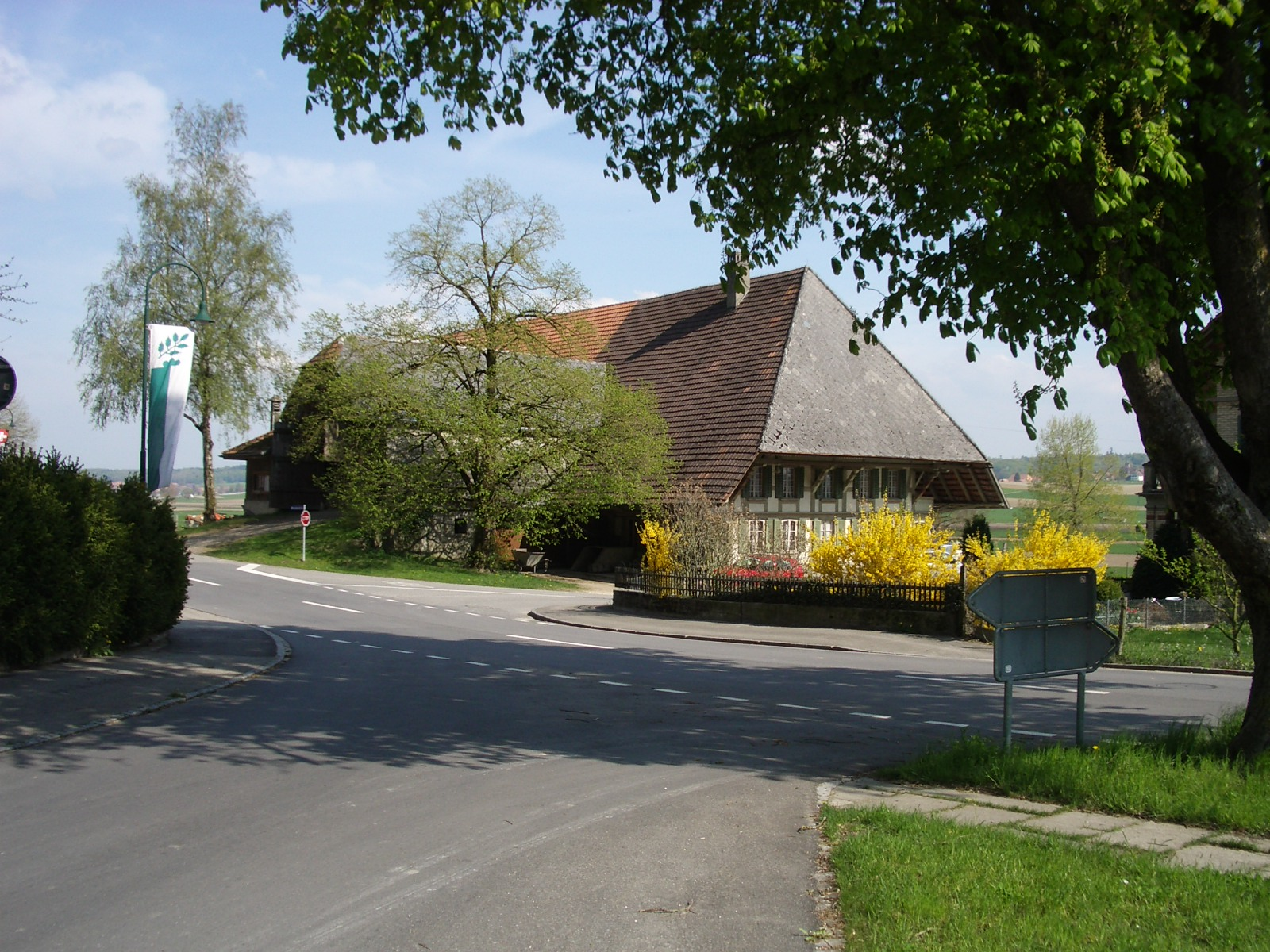
- Balm bei Messen village

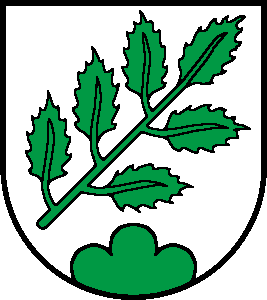
- Coat of arms
- Location of Balm bei Messen
- Location within Switzerland Location within Canton of Solothurn
- Coordinates: 47°6′N 7°26′E
- Country: Switzerland
- Canton: Solothurn
- District: Bucheggberg

Area
  - Total: 2.18 km^{2} (0.84 sq mi)
- Elevation: 476 m (1,562 ft)

Population (December 2005)
  - Total: 111
  - Density: 50.9/km^{2} (132/sq mi)
- Time zone: UTC+01:00 (CET)
  - Summer (DST): UTC+02:00 (CEST)
- Postal code: 3254
- SFOS number: 2443
- ISO 3166 code: CH-SO
- Surrounded by: Biezwil, Lüterswil-Gächliwil, Messen, Oberramsern, Ruppoldsried (BE), Schnottwil, Wengi (BE)
- Website: SFSO statistics

Balm bei Messen was a municipality in the district of Bucheggberg in the canton of Solothurn in Switzerland. On 1 January 2010 the municipalities of Balm bei Messen, Brunnenthal and Oberramsern merged into the municipality of Messen.

== History ==
Balm bei Messen was first mentioned in 1254 as de Balmo. In 1275 it was mentioned as in Balm.

== Geography ==
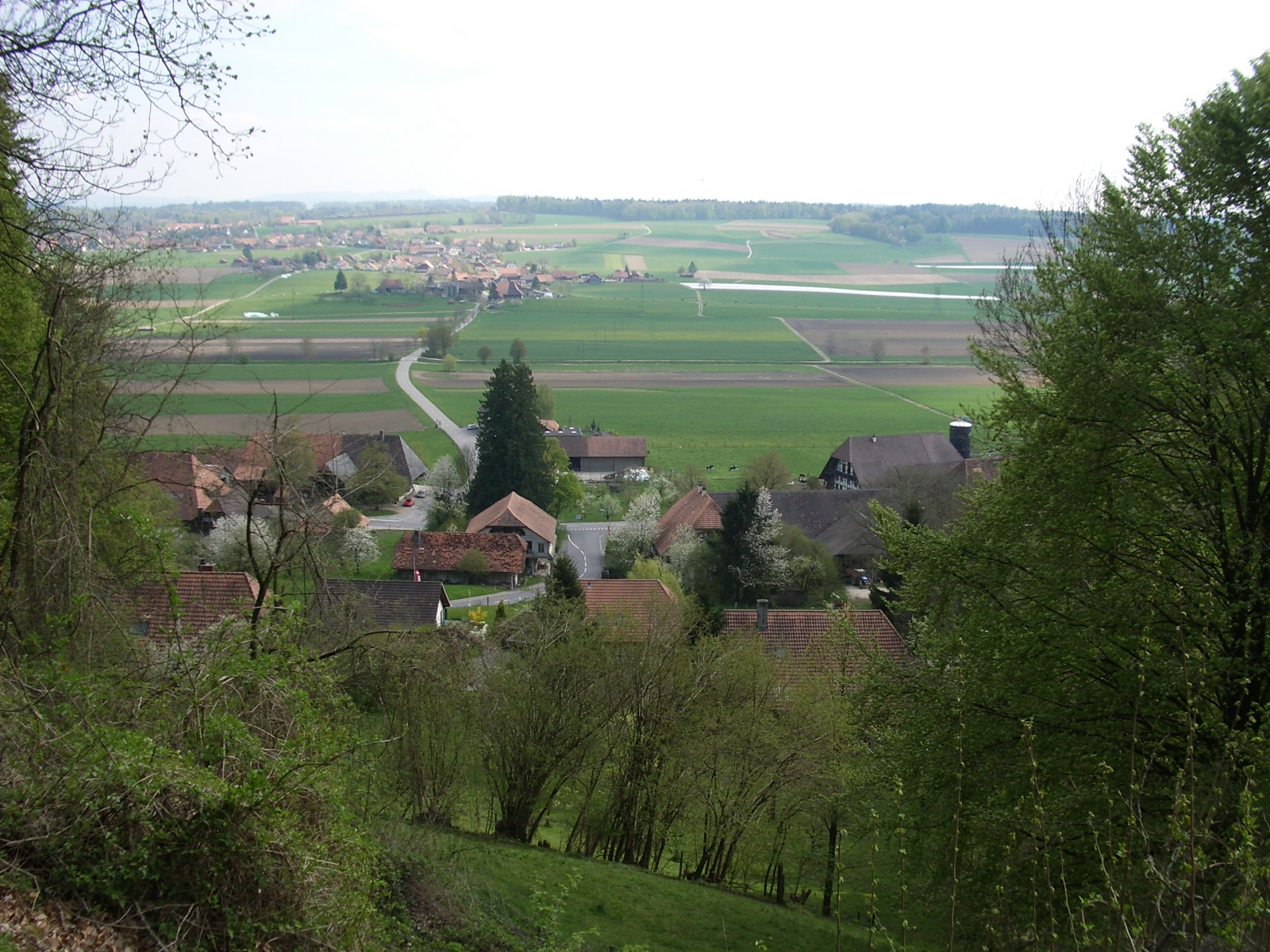
Village of Balm bei Messen

Balm bei Messen has an area, as of 2009, of 2.18 square kilometers (0.84 sq mi). Of this area, 1.3 km^{2} (0.50 sq mi) or 59.6% is used for agricultural purposes, while 0.7 km^{2} (0.27 sq mi) or 32.1% is forested. Of the rest of the land, 0.16 km^{2} (0.062 sq mi) or 7.3% is settled (buildings or roads).

Of the built up area, housing and buildings made up 4.1% and transportation infrastructure made up 3.2%. Out of the forested land, 30.7% of the total land area is heavily forested and 1.4% is covered with orchards or small clusters of trees. Of the agricultural land, 54.1% is used for growing crops and 5.5% is pastures.

The village is located in the Bucheggberg district, in the Limpach along the southern slope of the Bucheggberg. It consists of the haufendorf village (an irregular, unplanned and quite closely packed village, built around a central square) of Balm bei Messen.

== Coat of arms ==
The blazon of the municipal coat of arms is Argent a Holly Branch Vert in bend sinister over a Mount of 3 Coupeaux of the same.

== Demographics ==
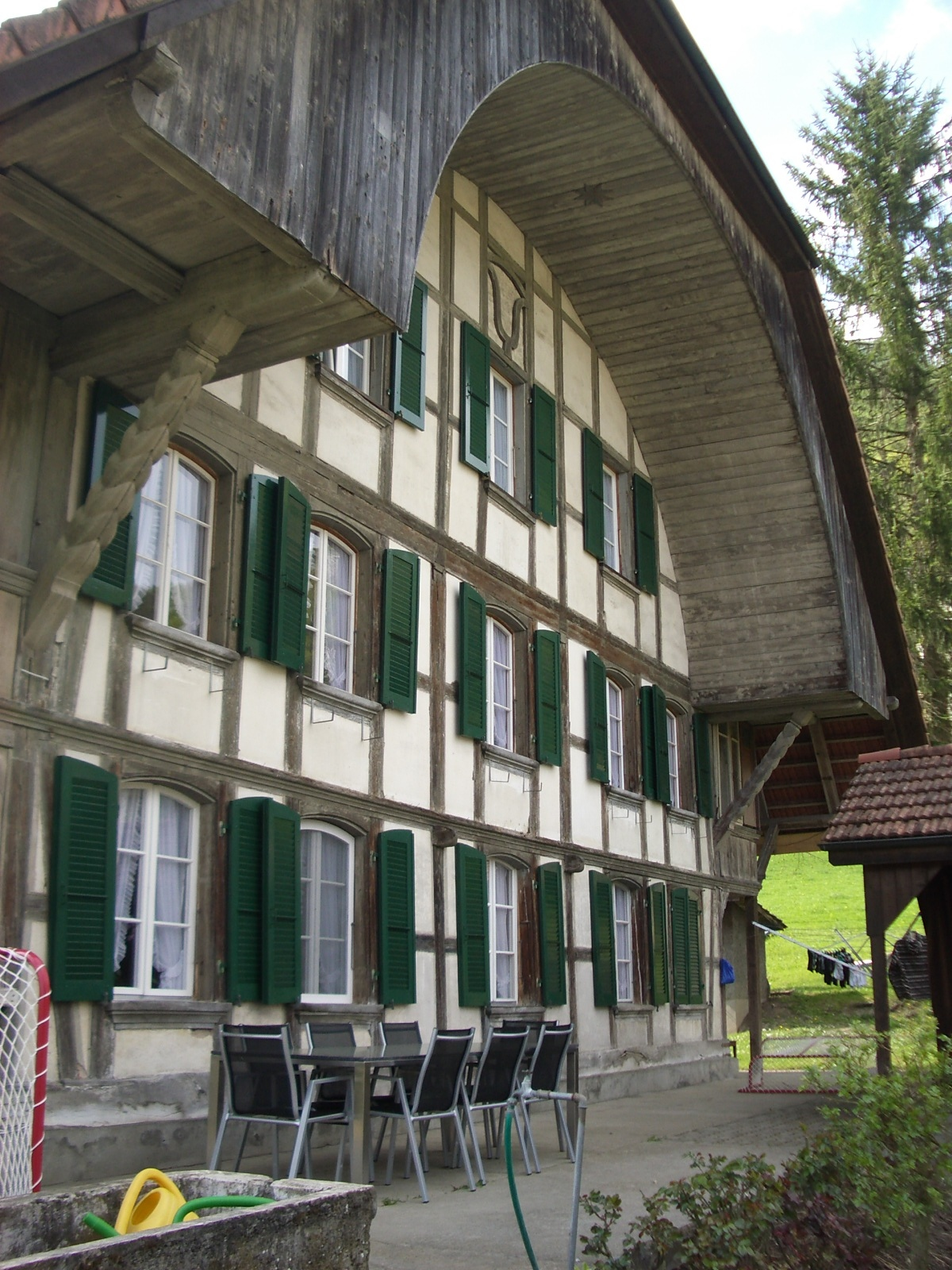
House in Balm bei Messen

Balm bei Messen has a population (As of December 2005) of 111. Over the last 10 years (1999–2009 ) the population has changed at a rate of 0%.

Most of the population (as of 2000) speaks German (107 or 98.2%), with French being second most common (1 or 0.9%) and Albanian being third (1 or 0.9%).

Of the population in the village 49 or about 45.0% were born in Balm bei Messen and lived there in 2000. There were 22 or 20.2% who were born in the same canton, while 30 or 27.5% were born somewhere else in Switzerland, and 5 or 4.6% were born outside of Switzerland.

In 2008 there were 2 live births to Swiss citizens and were 2 deaths of Swiss citizens. Ignoring immigration and emigration, the population of Swiss citizens remained the same as did the foreign population. The total Swiss population remained the same in 2008 and the non-Swiss population remained the same. This represents a population growth rate of 0.0%.

The age distribution, as of 2000, in Balm bei Messen is; 4 children or 3.7% of the population are between 0 and 6 years old and 31 teenagers or 28.4% are between 7 and 19. Of the adult population, 5 people or 4.6% of the population are between 20 and 24 years old. 30 people or 27.5% are between 25 and 44, and 24 people or 22.0% are between 45 and 64. The senior population distribution is 11 people or 10.1% of the population are between 65 and 79 years old and there are 4 people or 3.7% who are over 80.

As of 2000, there were 44 people who were single and never married in the village. There were 57 married individuals, 5 widows or widowers and 3 individuals who are divorced.

There were 10 households that consist of only one person and 4 households with five or more people. Out of a total of 41 households that answered this question, 24.4% were households made up of just one person. Of the rest of the households, there are 11 married couples without children, 17 married couples with children There was one single parent with a child or children.

In 2000 there were 14 single-family homes (or 42.4% of the total) out of a total of 33 inhabited buildings. There were 4 multi-family buildings (12.1%) and along with 15 multi-purpose buildings that were mostly used for housing (45.5%). Of the single-family homes 7 were built before 1919, while 1 was built between 1990 and 2000.

In 2000 there were 39 apartments in the village. The most common apartment size was 5 rooms of which there were 10. There were single room apartments and 21 apartments with five or more rooms. Of these apartments, a total of 35 apartments (89.7% of the total) were permanently occupied, while 4 apartments (10.3%) were seasonally occupied.

The historical population is given in the following chart:

== Politics ==
In the 2007 federal election the most popular party was the FDP which received 44.27% of the vote. The next three most popular parties were the SVP (29.26%), the SP (17.81%) and the Green Party (4.07%). In the federal election, a total of 57 votes were cast, and the voter turnout was 64.8%.

== Economy ==
There were 55 residents of the village who were employed in some capacity, of which females made up 40.0% of the workforce.

In 2008 the total number of full-time equivalent jobs was 25. The number of jobs in the primary sector was 11, all of which were in agriculture. There were no jobs in the secondary sector. The number of jobs in the tertiary sector was 14. In the tertiary sector; 4 or 28.6% were in the sale or repair of motor vehicles, 2 or 14.3% were in a hotel or restaurant, 4 or 28.6% were in the information industry, 1 was the insurance or financial industry, 2 or 14.3% were in education.

In 2000, there were 34 workers who commuted away from the village.

== Religion ==
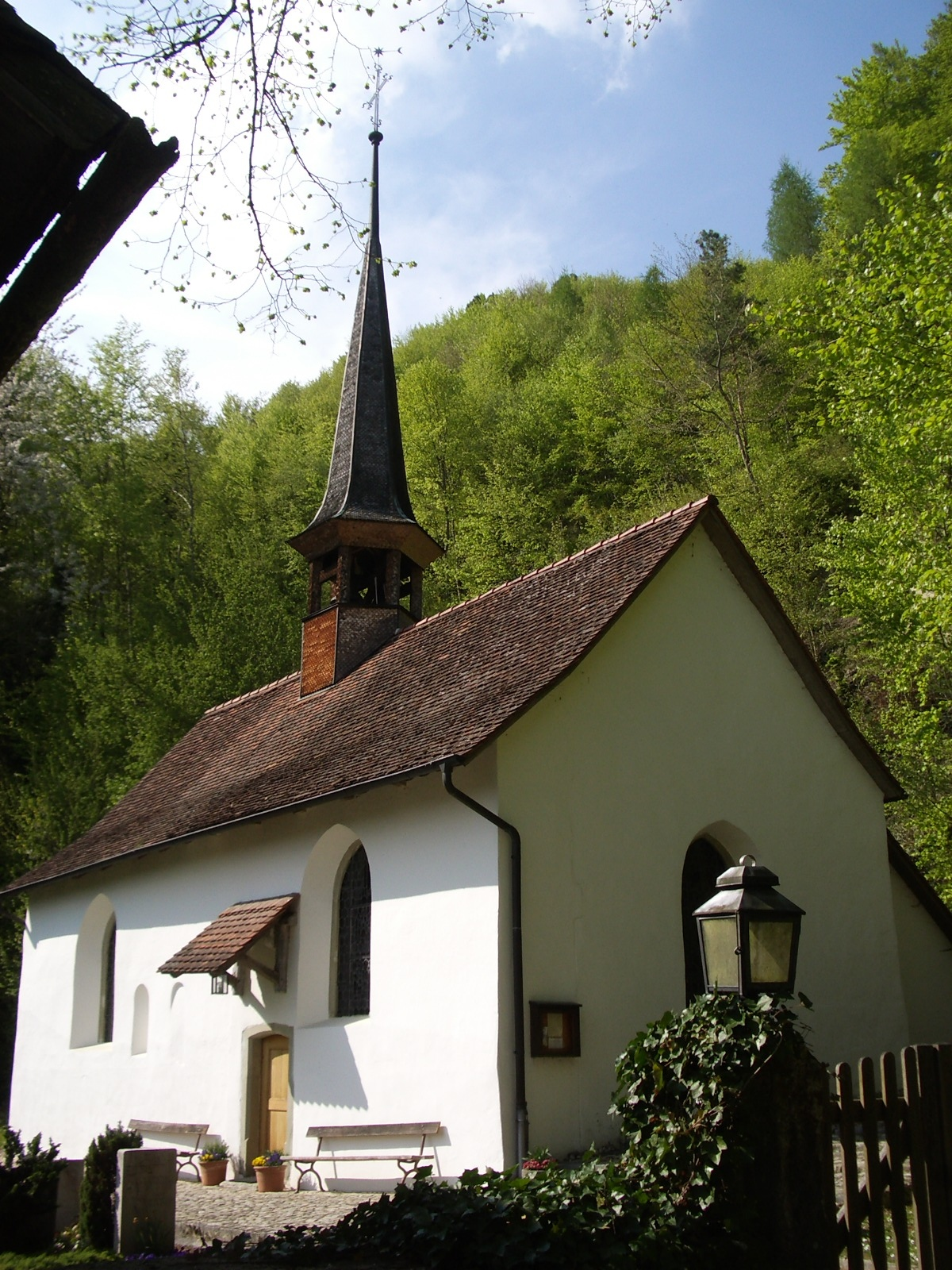
Church in Balm bei Messen

From the 2000 census, 13 or 11.9% were Roman Catholic, while 88 or 80.7% belonged to the Swiss Reformed Church. Of the rest of the population, there were 2 members of an Orthodox church (or about 1.83% of the population). 4 (or about 3.67% of the population) belonged to no church, are agnostic or atheist, and 2 individuals (or about 1.83% of the population) did not answer the question.

== Education ==
In Balm bei Messen about 37 or (33.9%) of the population have completed non-mandatory upper secondary education, and 12 or (11.0%) have completed additional higher education (either University or a Fachhochschule). Of the 12 who completed tertiary schooling, 75.0% were Swiss men, 25.0% were Swiss women.

As of 2000, there were 27 students from Balm bei Messen who attended schools outside the village.
