= Oberramsern =

- Former municipality
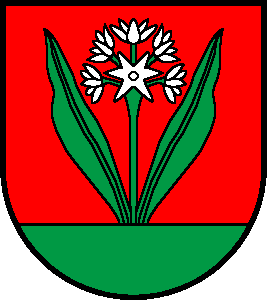
- Coat of arms
- Location of Oberramsern
- Location within Switzerland Location within Canton of Solothurn
- Coordinates: 47°7′N 7°28′E
- Country: Switzerland
- Canton: Solothurn
- District: Bucheggberg

Area
  - Total: 1.75 km^{2} (0.68 sq mi)
- Elevation: 475 m (1,558 ft)

Population (December 2005)
  - Total: 96
  - Density: 55/km^{2} (140/sq mi)
- Time zone: UTC+01:00 (CET)
  - Summer (DST): UTC+02:00 (CEST)
- Postal code: 4588
- SFOS number: 2460
- ISO 3166 code: CH-SO
- Surrounded by: Aetigkofen, Balm bei Messen, Lüterswil-Gächliwil, Messen, Mülchi (BE), Unterramsern
- Website: www.oberramsern.ch

Oberramsern was a municipality in the district of Bucheggberg in the canton of Solothurn in Switzerland. On 1 January 2010, the municipalities of Balm bei Messen, Brunnenthal and Oberramsern merged into the municipality of Messen.

== History ==
Oberramsern is first mentioned in 1276 as Rambsern though this comes from a 17th-century copy of the original. In 1318 it was mentioned as Ramserron superiori.

== Geography ==
Oberramsern has an area, as of 2009, of 1.75 square kilometers (0.68 sq mi). Of this area, 1.18 km^{2} (0.46 sq mi) or 67.4% is used for agricultural purposes, while 0.5 km^{2} (0.19 sq mi) or 28.6% is forested. Of the rest of the land, 0.07 km^{2} (17 acres) or 4.0% is settled (buildings or roads), 0.02 km^{2} (4.9 acres) or 1.1% is either rivers or lakes.

Of the built up area, housing and buildings made up 3.4% and transportation infrastructure made up 0.6%. Out of the forested land, all of the forested land area is covered with heavy forests. Of the agricultural land, 53.1% is used for growing crops and 13.7% is pastures. All the water in the village is flowing water.

The village is located in the Bucheggberg district, in the Limpach valley along the southern slope of the Bucheggberg. It consists of the linear village of Oberramsern.

== Coat of arms ==
The blazon of the municipal coat of arms is Gules a Bear's Garlic Argent slipped and leaved Vert issuant from a Base of the last.

== Demographics ==
Oberramsern has a population (As of December 2009) of 96. Over the last 10 years (1999-2009 ) the population has changed at a rate of 0%.

In 2000, all of the population (91 at the time) spoke German.

Of the population in the village 41 or about 45.1% were born in Oberramsern and lived there in 2000. There were 14 or 15.4% who were born in the same canton, while 34 or 37.4% were born somewhere else in Switzerland, and 1 was born outside of Switzerland.

In 2008 there was 1 live birth to Swiss citizens and were 2 deaths of Swiss citizens. Ignoring immigration and emigration, the population of Swiss citizens decreased by 1 while the foreign population remained the same. The total Swiss population change in 2008 (from all sources, including moves across municipal borders) was a decrease of 2 and the non-Swiss population remained the same. This represents a population growth rate of -2.2%.

The age distribution, as of 2000, in Oberramsern is; 8 children or 8.8% of the population are between 0 and 6 years old and 12 teenagers or 13.2% are between 7 and 19. Of the adult population, 4 people or 4.4% of the population are between 20 and 24 years old. 25 people or 27.5% are between 25 and 44, and 22 people or 24.2% are between 45 and 64. The senior population distribution is 17 people or 18.7% of the population are between 65 and 79 years old and there are 3 people or 3.3% who are over 80.

As of 2000, there were 34 people who were single and never married in the village. There were 44 married individuals, 10 widows or widowers and 3 individuals who are divorced.

There were 9 households that consist of only one person and 2 households with five or more people. Out of a total of 39 households that answered this question, 23.1% were households made up of just one person and there were 1 adults who lived with their parents. Of the rest of the households, there are 12 married couples without children, 12 married couples with children There were 3 single parents with a child or children. There was 1 household that was made up of unrelated people and 1 household that was made up of some sort of institution or another collective housing.

In 2000 there were 12 single-family homes (or 35.3% of the total) out of a total of 34 inhabited buildings. There were 1 multi-family buildings (2.9%), along with 17 multi-purpose buildings that were mostly used for housing (50.0%) and 4 other use buildings (commercial or industrial) that also had some housing (11.8%). Of the single-family homes 1 were built before 1919, while 5 were built between 1990 and 2000. The greatest number of single-family homes (4) were built between 1961 and 1970.

In 2000 there were 40 apartments in the village. The most common apartment size was 5 rooms of which there were 12. There were 1 single room apartments and 19 apartments with five or more rooms. Of these apartments, a total of 35 apartments (87.5% of the total) were permanently occupied, while 3 apartments (7.5%) were seasonally occupied and 2 apartments (5.0%) were empty.

The historical population is given in the following chart:

== Politics ==
In the 2007 federal election the most popular party was the FDP which received 45.02% of the vote. The next three most popular parties were the SP (21.21%), the CVP (12.12%) and the Green Party (11.26%). In the federal election, a total of 33 votes were cast, and the voter turnout was 43.4%.

== Economy ==
There were 48 residents of the village who were employed in some capacity, of which females made up 43.8% of the workforce.

In 2008[update] the total number of full-time equivalent jobs was 15.  The number of jobs in the primary sector was 11, all of which were in agriculture.  The number of jobs in the secondary sector was 2, all of which were in construction.  The number of jobs in the tertiary sector was 2.  In the tertiary sector; 2 or 100.0% were in a hotel or restaurant, .[13]

In 2000, there were 8 workers who commuted into the village and 24 workers who commuted away. The village is a net exporter of workers, with about 3.0 workers leaving the village for every one entering. Of the working population, % used public transportation to get to work, and % used a private car.

== Religion ==
From the 2000 census, 4 or 4.4% were Roman Catholic, while 79 or 86.8% belonged to the Swiss Reformed Church. 7 (or about 7.69% of the population) belonged to no church, are agnostic or atheist, and 1 individual (or about 1.10% of the population) did not answer the question.

== Education ==
In Oberramsern about 34 or (37.4%) of the population have completed non-mandatory upper secondary education, and 13 or (14.3%) have completed additional higher education (either University or a Fachhochschule). Of the 13 who completed tertiary schooling, 61.5% were Swiss men, 30.8% were Swiss women. As of 2000, there were 8 students from Oberramsern who attended schools outside the village.
