= Aetigkofen =

- Former municipality
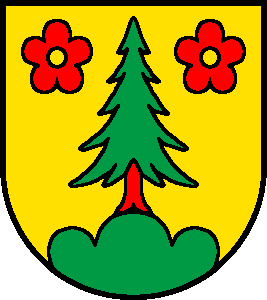
- Coat of arms
- Location of Aetigkofen
- Location within Switzerland Location within Canton of Solothurn
- Coordinates: 47°8′N 7°28′E
- Country: Switzerland
- Canton: Solothurn
- District: Bucheggberg

Area
  - Total: 2.05 km^{2} (0.79 sq mi)
- Elevation: 610 m (2,000 ft)

Population (Dec 2011)
  - Total: 177
  - Density: 86.3/km^{2} (224/sq mi)
- Time zone: UTC+01:00 (CET)
  - Summer (DST): UTC+02:00 (CEST)
- Postal code: 4583
- SFOS number: 2441
- ISO 3166 code: CH-SO
- Surrounded by: Lüterswil-Gächliwil, Mühledorf, Oberramsern, Unterramsern
- Website: www.buchegg-so.ch

Aetigkofen is a former municipality in the district of Bucheggberg in the canton of Solothurn in Switzerland. On 1 January 2014 the former municipalities of Aetigkofen, Tscheppach, Brügglen, Aetingen, Bibern (SO), Gossliwil, Hessigkofen, Mühledorf (SO), Küttigkofen, Kyburg-Buchegg merged into the new municipality of Buchegg.

== History ==
Aetigkofen is first mentioned in 1034 as Etikhouen.

== Geography ==
Before the merger, Aetigkofen had a total area of 2.0 km^{2} (0.77 mi^{2}). Of this area, 1.17 km^{2} (0.45 sq mi) or 57.1% is used for agricultural purposes, while 0.72 km^{2} (0.28 sq mi) or 35.1% is forested. Of the rest of the land, 0.14 km^{2} (35 acres) or 6.8% is settled (buildings or roads).

Of the built up area, housing and buildings made up 2.9% and transportation infrastructure made up 3.4%. Out of the forested land, all of the forested land area is covered with heavy forests. Of the agricultural land, 44.4% is used for growing crops and 10.7% is pastures, while 2.0% is used for orchards or vine crops.

The municipality is located in the Bucheggberg district, in the upper Mühle valley on the eastern foot of the Schöniberg mountain. It consists of the haufendorf village (an irregular, unplanned and quite closely packed village, built around a central square) of Aetigkofen and the Mettlen and Chutzenhof farm houses.

== Coat of arms ==
The blazon of the municipal coat of arms is Or a Fir tree Vert trunked Gules issuant from a Mount of 3 Coupeaux of the second between two cinquefoils of the third voided.

== Demographics ==
Aetigkofen had a population (as of 2011) of 177.

Most of the population (as of 2000) speaks German (175 or 97.8%) with the rest speaking French

As of 2008, the gender distribution of the population was 51.4% male and 48.6% female. The population was made up of 89 Swiss men (49.7% of the population) and 3 (1.7%) non-Swiss men. There were 87 Swiss women (48.6%) and no non-Swiss women. Of the population in the municipality 69 or about 38.5% were born in Aetigkofen and lived there in 2000. There were 50 or 27.9% who were born in the same canton, while 54 or 30.2% were born somewhere else in Switzerland, and 4 or 2.2% were born outside of Switzerland.

In 2008 there were 4 live births to Swiss citizens and were 5 deaths of Swiss citizens. Ignoring immigration and emigration, the population of Swiss citizens decreased by 1 while the foreign population remained the same. There was 1 Swiss man who immigrated back to Switzerland. The total Swiss population change in 2008 (from all sources, including moves across municipal borders) was a decrease of 6 and the non-Swiss population increased by 1 people. This represents a population growth rate of -2.7%.

The age distribution, as of 2000, in Aetigkofen is; 11 children or 6.1% of the population are between 0 and 6 years old and 41 teenagers or 22.9% are between 7 and 19. Of the adult population, 12 people or 6.7% of the population are between 20 and 24 years old. 52 people or 29.1% are between 25 and 44, and 40 people or 22.3% are between 45 and 64. The senior population distribution is 22 people or 12.3% of the population are between 65 and 79 years old and there is 1 person who is over 80.

As of 2000, there were 77 people who were single and never married in the municipality. There were 86 married individuals, 7 widows or widowers and 9 individuals who are divorced.

There were 15 households that consist of only one person and 9 households with five or more people. Out of a total of 66 households that answered this question, 22.7% were households made up of just one person. Of the rest of the households, there are 20 married couples without children, 26 married couples with children There were 3 single parents with a child or children.

In 2000 there were 26 single-family homes (or 53.1% of the total) out of a total of 49 inhabited buildings. There were 6 multi-family buildings (12.2%), along with 11 multi-purpose buildings that were mostly used for housing (22.4%) and 6 other use buildings (commercial or industrial) that also had some housing (12.2%).

In 2000 there were, a total of 64 apartments (94.1% of the total) were permanently occupied, while 1 apartment (1.5%) were seasonally occupied and 3 apartments (4.4%) were empty.

The historical population is given in the following chart:

== Politics ==
In the 2007 federal election the most popular party was the FDP which received 35.08% of the vote. The next three most popular parties were the SVP (21.92%), the SP (18.04%) and the Green Party (15.35%). In the federal election, a total of 85 votes were cast, and the voter turnout was 52.8%.

== Economy ==
There were 107 residents of the municipality who were employed in some capacity, of which females made up 43.9% of the workforce.

In 2008 the total number of full-time equivalent jobs was 38. The number of jobs in the primary sector was 14, of which 12 were in agriculture and 2 were in forestry or lumber production. The number of jobs in the secondary sector was 8, all of which were in construction. The number of jobs in the tertiary sector was 16. In the tertiary sector; 2 or 12.5% were in wholesale or retail sales or the repair of motor vehicles, 1 was in the movement and storage of goods, 5 or 31.3% were in a hotel or restaurant, 4 or 25.0% were technical professionals or scientists, 3 or 18.8% were in education.

In 2000, there were 11 workers who commuted into the municipality and 66 workers who commuted away. The municipality is a net exporter of workers, with about 6.0 workers leaving the municipality for every one entering.

== Religion ==
From the 2000 census, 8 or 4.5% were Roman Catholic, while 153 or 85.5% belonged to the Swiss Reformed Church. Of the rest of the population, and there was 1 individual who belongs to another Christian church. 16 (or about 8.94% of the population) belonged to no church, are agnostic or atheist, and 1 individuals (or about 0.56% of the population) did not answer the question.

== Education ==
In Aetigkofen about 68 or (38.0%) of the population have completed non-mandatory upper secondary education, and 20 or (11.2%) have completed additional higher education (either university or a Fachhochschule). Of the 20 who completed tertiary schooling, 80.0% were Swiss men, 20.0% were Swiss women.

As of 2000, there were 34 students in Aetigkofen who came from another municipality, while 26 residents attended schools outside the municipality.
