= Brunnenthal, Switzerland =

Brunnenthal
- Former municipality
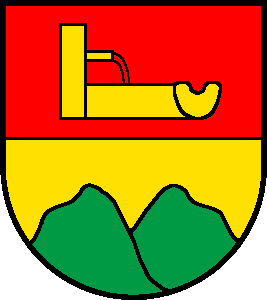
- Coat of arms
- Location of Brunnenthal
- Location within Switzerland Location within Canton of Solothurn
- Coordinates: 47°5′N 7°28′E
- Country: Switzerland
- Canton: Solothurn
- District: Bucheggberg

Area
  - Total: 0.88 km^{2} (0.34 sq mi)
- Elevation: 541 m (1,775 ft)

Population (December 2005)
  - Total: 203
  - Density: 230/km^{2} (600/sq mi)
- Time zone: UTC+01:00 (CET)
  - Summer (DST): UTC+02:00 (CEST)
- Postal code: 3307
- SFOS number: 2447
- ISO 3166 code: CH-SO
- Surrounded by: Etzelkofen (BE), Messen, Mülchi (BE), Scheunen (BE)
- Website: SFSO statistics

Brunnenthal was a municipality in the district of Bucheggberg, in the canton of Solothurn, Switzerland. On 1 January 2010 the municipalities of Balm bei Messen, Brunnenthal and Oberramsern merged into the municipality of Messen.

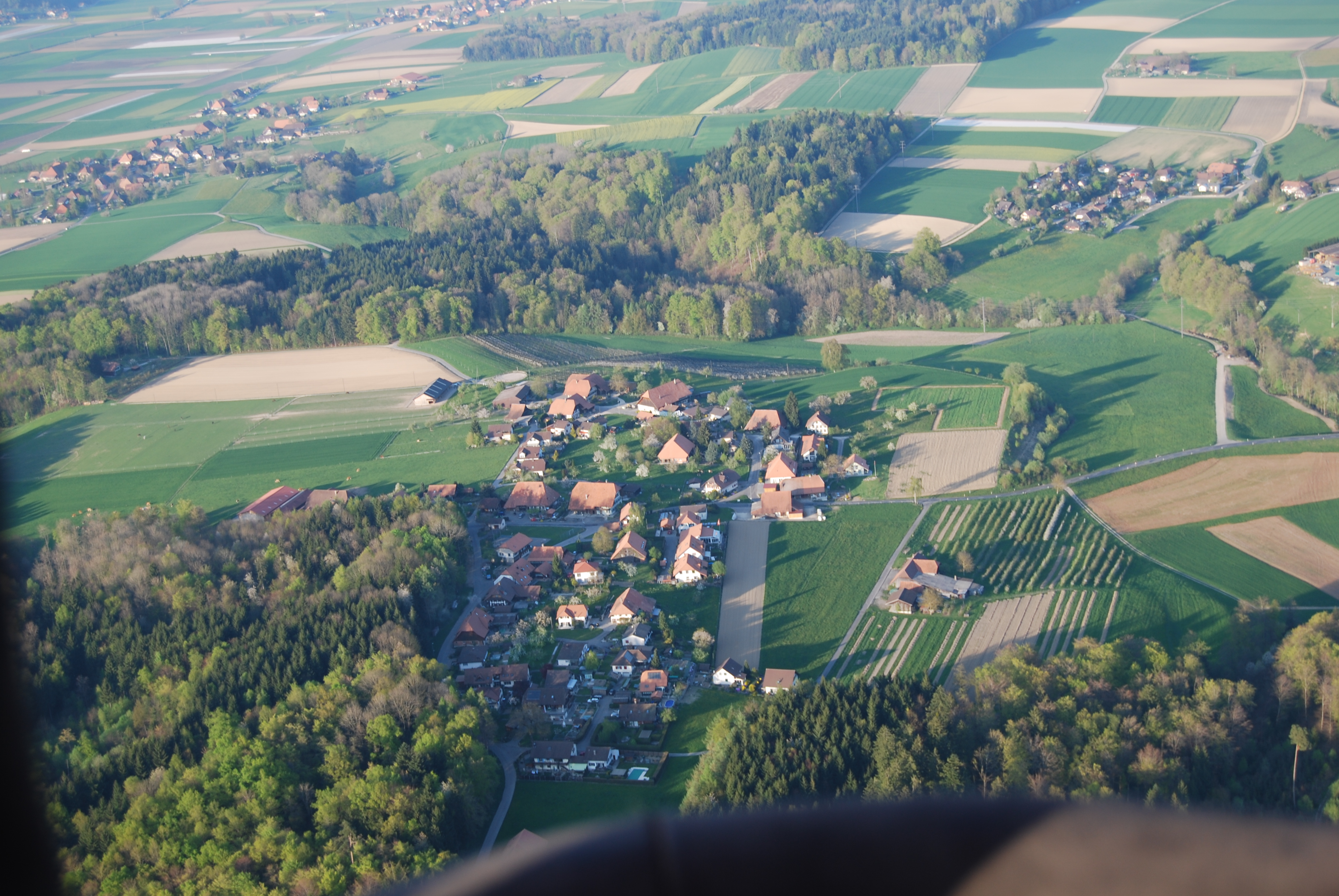
Brunnenthal

== History ==
Brunnenthal is first mentioned in 1387 as Wernher von Brunnental. In 1396 it was mentioned as Brunental.

== Geography ==
Brunnenthal has an area, as of 2009, of 0.88 square kilometers (0.34 sq mi). Of this area, 0.68 km^{2} (0.26 sq mi) or 77.3% is used for agricultural purposes, while 0.09 km^{2} (0.035 sq mi) or 10.2% is forested. Of the rest of the land, 0.13 km^{2} (32 acres) or 14.8% is settled (buildings or roads) and 0.01 km^{2} (2.5 acres) or 1.1% is unproductive land.

Of the built up area, housing and buildings made up 6.8% and transportation infrastructure made up 2.3%. Power and water infrastructure as well as other special developed areas made up 3.4% of the area while parks, green belts and sports fields made up 2.3%. Out of the forested land, 8.0% of the total land area is heavily forested and 2.3% is covered with orchards or small clusters of trees. Of the agricultural land, 47.7% is used for growing crops and 22.7% is pastures, while 6.8% is used for orchards or vine crops.

The village is located in the Bucheggberg district, on the northern edge of the Rapperswil plateau. It consists of the village of Brunnenthal and the hamlets of Burgsumpf and Burg.

== Coat of arms ==
The blazon of the municipal coat of arms is Per fess Gules a Wooden Fountain Or and of the last two Mounts Vert.

== Demographics ==
Brunnenthal has a population (As of December 2005) of 203. Over the last 10 years (1999-2009 ) the population has changed at a rate of 0%.

Most of the population (as of 2000) speaks German (184 or 97.4%) with the rest speaking Dutch

Of the population in the village 73 or about 38.6% were born in Brunnenthal and lived there in 2000. There were 18 or 9.5% who were born in the same canton, while 84 or 44.4% were born elsewhere in Switzerland, and 5 or 2.6% were born outside of Switzerland.

In 2008 there were 2 live births to Swiss citizens and . Ignoring immigration and emigration, the population of Swiss citizens increased by 2 while the foreign population remained the same. There was 1 Swiss man and 1 Swiss woman who immigrated back to Switzerland. The total Swiss population change in 2008 (from all sources, including moves across municipal borders) was an increase of 9 and the non-Swiss population remained the same. This represents a population growth rate of 4.6%.

The age distribution, as of 2000, in Brunnenthal is; 17 children or 9.0% of the population are between 0 and 6 years old and 33 teenagers or 17.5% are between 7 and 19. Of the adult population, 2 people or 1.1% of the population are between 20 and 24 years old. 57 people or 30.2% are between 25 and 44, and 52 people or 27.5% are between 45 and 64. The senior population distribution is 22 people or 11.6% of the population are between 65 and 79 years old and there are 6 people or 3.2% who are over 80.

As of 2000, there were 76 people who were single and never married in the village. There were 102 married individuals, 9 widows or widowers and 2 individuals who are divorced.

As of 2000 the average number of residents per living room was which is fewer people per room than the cantonal average of 0.56 per room. In this case, a room is defined as space of a housing unit of at least 4 m^{2} (43 sq ft) as normal bedrooms, dining rooms, living rooms, kitchens and habitable cellars and attics. About % of the total households were owner occupied, or in other words did not pay rent (though they may have a mortgage or a rent-to-own agreement).

As of 2000, there were private households in the village, and an average of . persons per household. There were 14 households that consist of only one person and 4 households with five or more people. Out of a total of 74 households that answered this question, 18.9% were households made up of just one person. Of the rest of the households, there are 27 married couples without children, 30 married couples with children There was one single parent with a child or children. There was 1 household that was made up of unrelated people and 1 household that was made up of some sort of institution or another collective housing.

In 2000 there were 42 single family homes (or 66.7% of the total) out of a total of 63 inhabited buildings. There were 4 multi-family buildings (6.3%), along with 13 multi-purpose buildings that were mostly used for housing (20.6%) and 4 other use buildings (commercial or industrial) that also had some housing (6.3%). Of the single family homes 8 were built before 1919, while 11 were built between 1990 and 2000. The greatest number of single family homes (10) were built between 1971 and 1980.

In 2000 there were 73 apartments in the village. The most common apartment size was 4 rooms of which there were 29. There were 1 single room apartments and 30 apartments with five or more rooms. Of these apartments, a total of 70 apartments (95.9% of the total) were permanently occupied, while 1 apartments (1.4%) were seasonally occupied and 2 apartments (2.7%) were empty. As of 2009, the construction rate of new housing units was new units per 1000 residents. The vacancy rate for the village, in 2010, was %.

The historical population is given in the following chart:

== Politics ==
In the 2007 federal election the most popular party was the SVP which received 34.72% of the vote. The next three most popular parties were the FDP (26.25%), the SP (24.09%) and the CVP (7.64%). In the federal election, a total of 88 votes were cast, and the voter turnout was 56.8%.

== Economy ==
As of 2010, Brunnenthal had an unemployment rate of 0%. As of 2008, there were people employed in the primary economic sector and about businesses involved in this sector. people were employed in the secondary sector and there were businesses in this sector. people were employed in the tertiary sector, with businesses in this sector. There were 97 residents of the village who were employed in some capacity, of which females made up 40.2% of the workforce.

In 2008 the total number of full-time equivalent jobs was 23. The number of jobs in the primary sector was 9, all of which were in agriculture. The number of jobs in the secondary sector was 9, all of which were in construction. The number of jobs in the tertiary sector was 5. In the tertiary sector; 2 or 40.0% were in a hotel or restaurant, 3 or 60.0% were technical professionals or scientists, .

In 2000, there were 5 workers who commuted into the village and 76 workers who commuted away. The village is a net exporter of workers, with about 15.2 workers leaving the village for every one entering. Of the working population, % used public transportation to get to work, and % used a private car.

== Religion ==
From the 2000 census, 7 or 3.7% were Roman Catholic, while 160 or 84.7% belonged to the Swiss Reformed Church. Of the rest of the population, there was 1 individual who belongs to the Christian Catholic Church. 10 (or about 5.29% of the population) belonged to no church, are agnostic or atheist, and 11 individuals (or about 5.82% of the population) did not answer the question.

== Education ==
In Brunnenthal about 76 or (40.2%) of the population have completed non-mandatory upper secondary education, and 14 or (7.4%) have completed additional higher education (either University or a Fachhochschule). Of the 14 who completed tertiary schooling, 78.6% were Swiss men, 21.4% were Swiss women.

As of 2000, there were 3 students in Brunnenthal who came from another village, while 13 residents attended schools outside the village.
