= Hauert =

Swiss fertilizer company

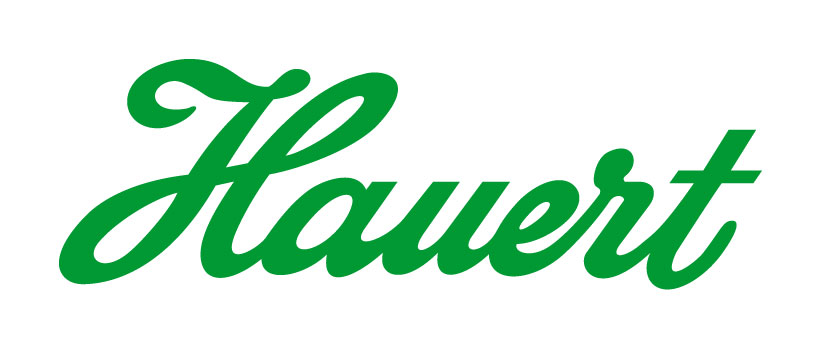
- Native name: Hauert HBG Dünger AG
- Industry: Fertilizers
- Founded: 1663
- Headquarters: Dorfstrasse 12, 3257 Grossaffoltern, Switzerland
- Number of employees: about 100
- Website: www.hauert.com

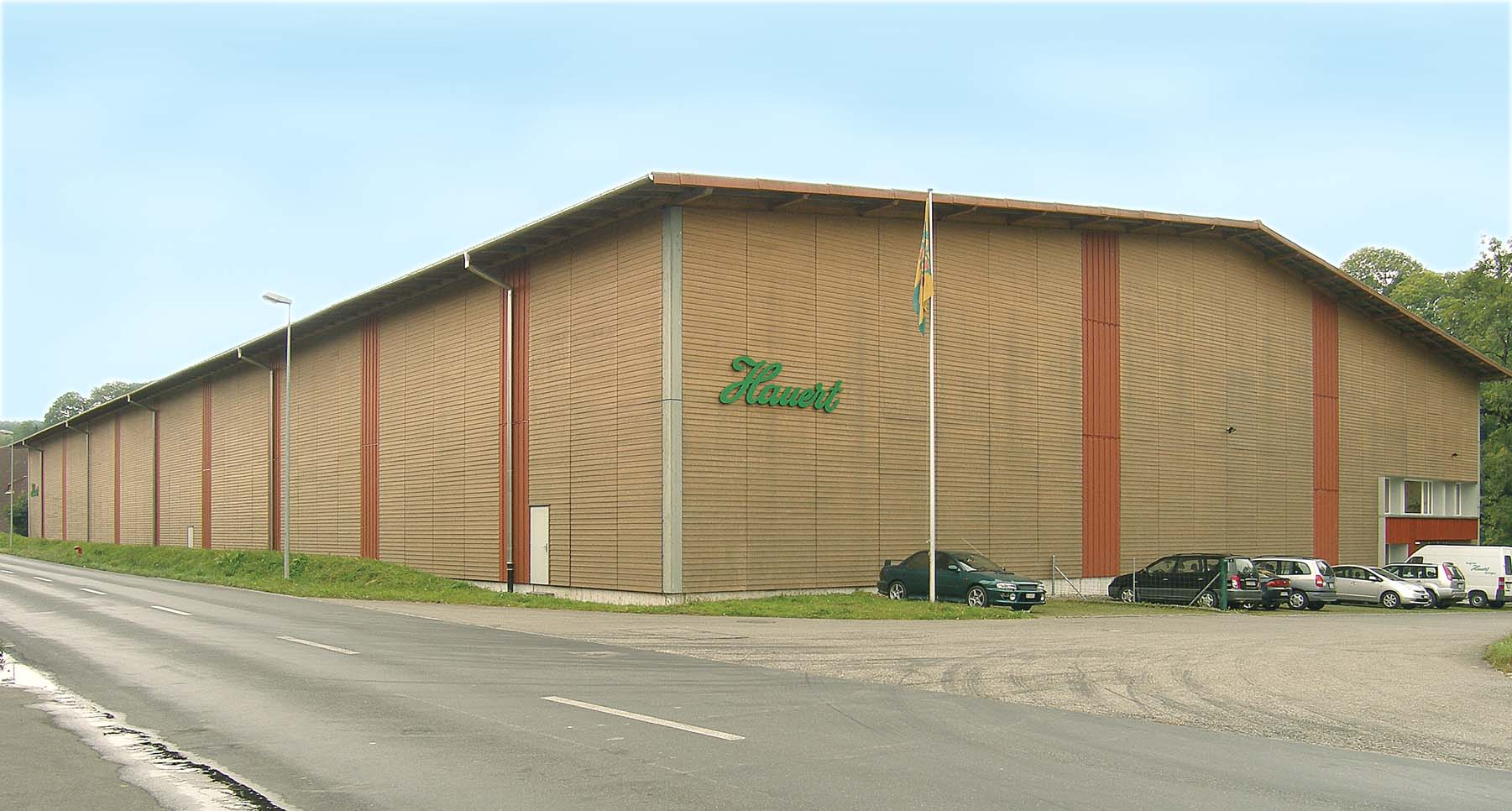
Hauert logistics building

Hauert HBG Dünger is the oldest Swiss producer of fertilizers for the horticulture and organic farming, founded in 1663 and located in Grossaffoltern, Canton of Bern.

== History ==
On 18 June 1663 Adam Hauert received the concession from the Schultheiss and the Council of Bern to operate a tannery. Each tanning operation included a dumping bump for crushing the oak bark. But it was also used to destroy animal bones. The peasants brought the crushed bones as fertilizer to the fields. Alexander Hauert and his brother Fritz were forced to close the tannery in 1911. They retained the bone mill and began producing bone meal for livestock feed as well as fertilizers under the name "Gebrüder Hauert" (Hauert Brothers).

According to company records, Alexander Hauert and his son Johann (1905–1988), founded the Kollektivgesellschaft (general partnership) Hauert & Co. on 1 August 1929. The new firm relocated the bone mill to a former fruit warehouse in Suberg and focused exclusively on fertilizer production.

From the middle of the 18th century onwards, fertilization became more and more important. The Economic Society of Berne supported the systematic collection of manure and urine into manure pits. Since farmyard fertilizers soon could no longer meet demand, the demand for bone meal, marl, and lime rose since the beginning of the nineteenth century. In addition, Justus von Liebig (1803-1873), with his mineral theory of 1840, prepared the way for the fertilizer industry.

In 1972, the company introduced a resin-coated slow-release fertilizer. Since 1985, it has operated its own in-house laboratory, which is also used as a basic research facility for fertilizer development. Both laboratory and field trials are conducted to test raw materials and recipes.

In the 1990s, the company experienced setbacks when bone meal was banned in the wake of the BSE crisis. Fertilizer worth several million francs had to be incinerated. The prices of raw materials nitrogen, potassium, and phosphorus surged by 160% within just a few months in 1998, due to increased global demand, Hauert was forced to pay the high prices to comply with its contracts with major customers.

In 2004, Hauert & Co. was converted into Hauert HBG Dünger AG. Since 2006, the company has been led by Philipp Hauert. He has served as the sole owner since 2010. In 2007, the company acquired the German fertilizer manufacturer Günther Cornufera with the aim of establishing a presence in the European market. The acquisition was accompanied by the founding of Hauert Günther Düngerwerke GmbH in Nuremberg. In 2018, the German firm Manna, based in Ammerbuch, was integrated into Hauert Manna Düngerwerke GmbH. Approximately 30,000 tons of fertilizer were produced in 2016. Hauert generates 80% of its revenue during the first few months of the year; demand for fertilizer typically begins to decline from late May onwards.

== Locations ==
The company's headquarters is located in Grossaffoltern, with its factory situated a few hundred metres away in Suberg. Around 65 people work at the Suberg plant and the Grossaffoltern headquarters combined. The company operates internationally, including through two German operations based in Saarbrücken and Nuremberg, which employ roughly 35 people in total.

== See also ==
- List of oldest companies
