= Wengi =

- Municipality
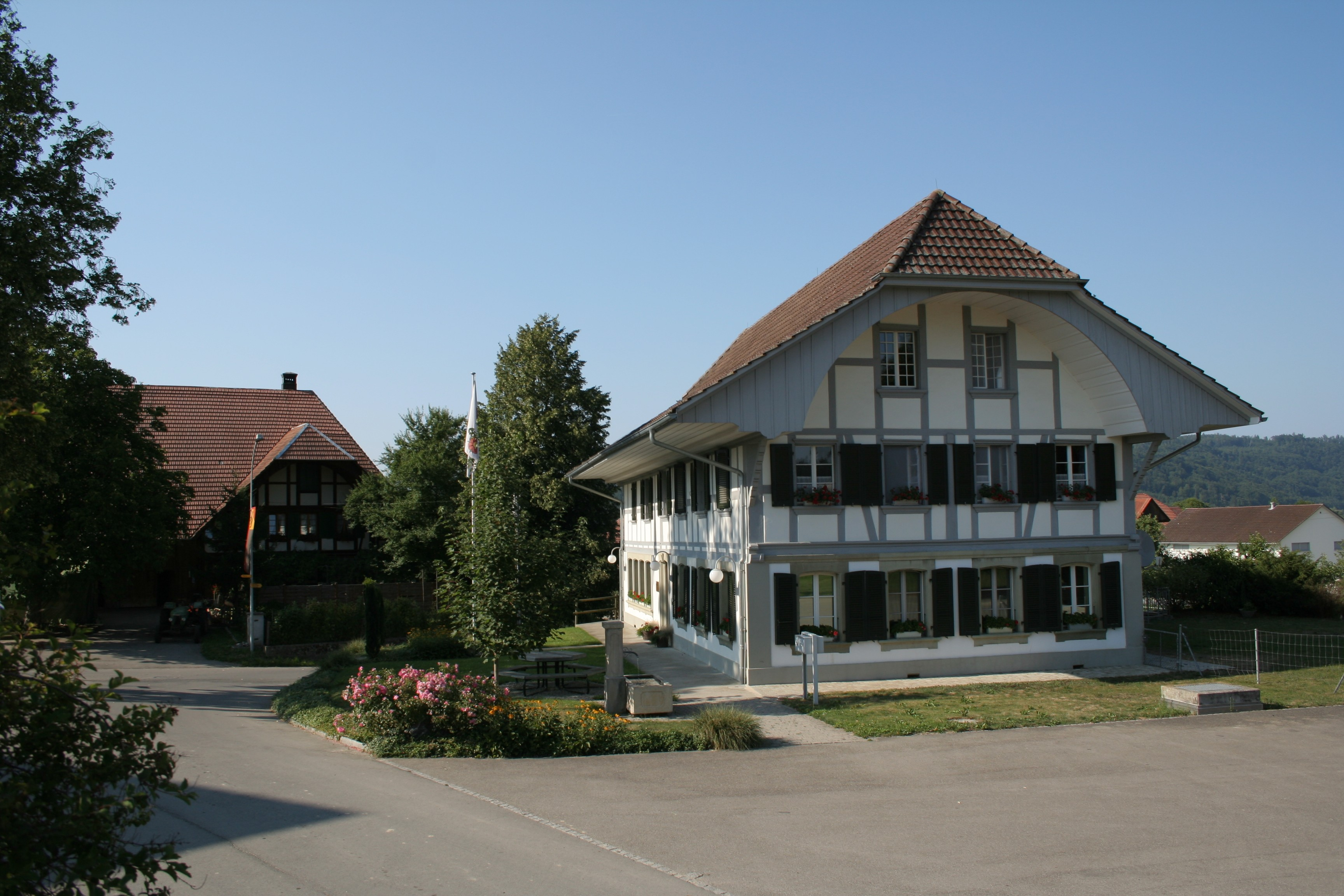
- Wengi village administration building

- Flag Coat of arms
- Location of Wengi
- Location within Switzerland Location within Canton of Bern
- Coordinates: 47°5′N 7°24′E
- Country: Switzerland
- Canton: Bern
- District: Seeland

Area
  - Total: 7.10 km^{2} (2.74 sq mi)
- Elevation: 480 m (1,570 ft)

Population (December 2020)
  - Total: 630
  - Density: 89/km^{2} (230/sq mi)
- Time zone: UTC+01:00 (CET)
  - Summer (DST): UTC+02:00 (CEST)
- Postal code: 3251
- SFOS number: 394
- ISO 3166 code: CH-BE
- Surrounded by: Balm bei Messen (SO), Diessbach bei Büren, Grossaffoltern, Rapperswil, Ruppoldsried, Schnottwil (SO)
- Website: www.wengi-be.ch

Wengi is a municipality in the Seeland administrative district in the canton of Bern in Switzerland.

== History ==
Wengi is first mentioned around 1261–63 as Wengw. In 1303 it was mentioned as Wengi.

The earliest traces of human settlement come from neolithic tools discovered at Wengimoos. A few scattered Roman era artifacts were discovered at Äbeni. During the Early and High Middle Ages the wooden castle of Guldige Hubel in Übererlenacher guarded the village. During the Middle Ages, the village of Wengi and the hamlets of Scheunenberg and Waltwil were all part of the municipality of Grossaffoltern and were owned by the House of Kyburg. After the extinction of the Kyburgs, the villages passed through the hands of a number of nobles.

The village St. Mary's Church was probably first built during the 8th or 9th century. The first church was replaced with a new building in the 13th century and was built as the seat of a dean. In 1521 the second church was destroyed in a fire. It was rebuilt with a nave and dedicated to St. Maurice.

Beginning in the 18th century and continuing until World War II, peat was harvested for heating from the Wengimoos bog. The extensive peat bogs proved to be a difficult obstacle during the amelioration of the Limpach valley between 1944 and 1951. In 1961, the Wengimoos was made into a nature preserve to protect the delicate bog ecosystem.

== Geography ==
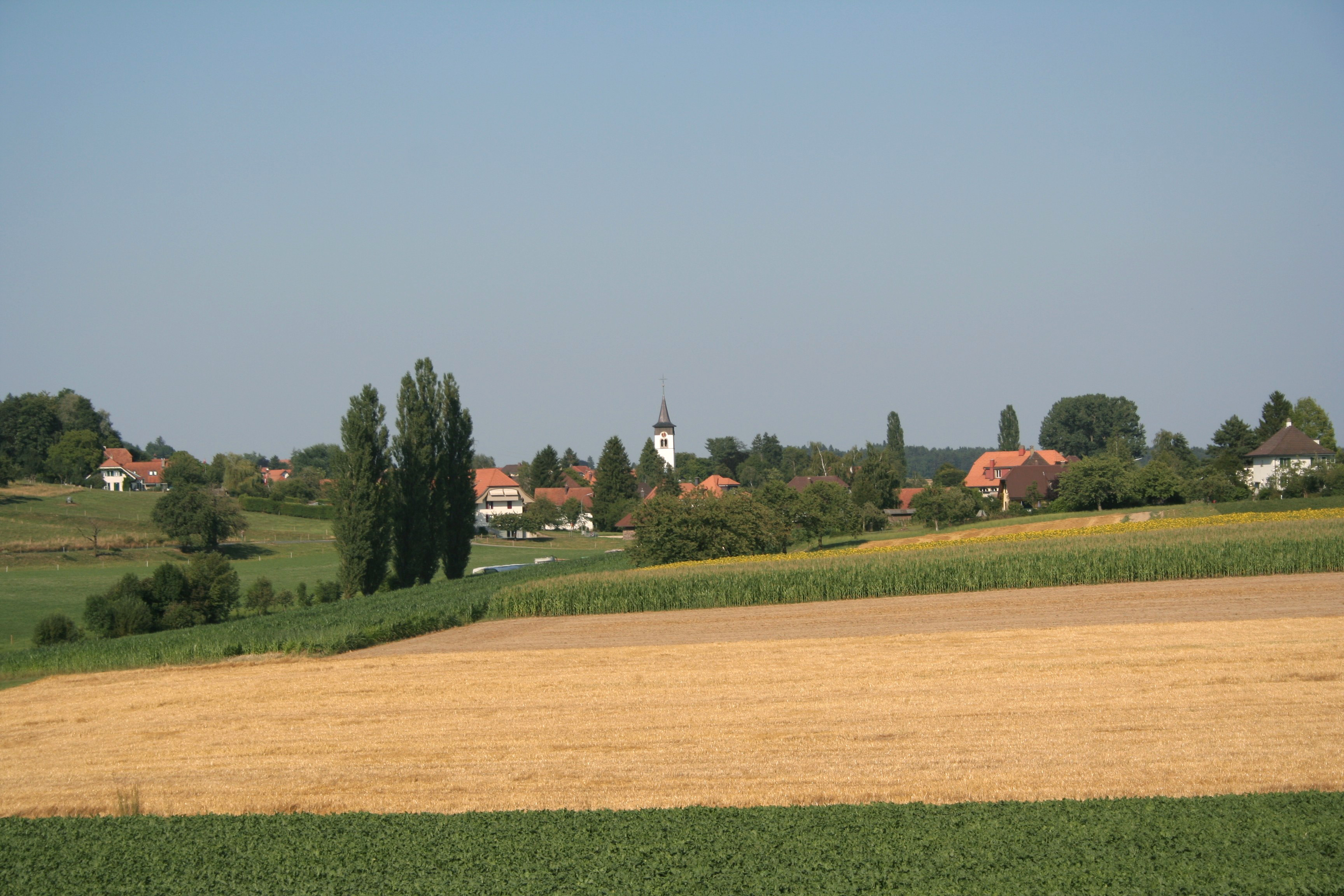
Wengi and surrounding fields

Wengi has an area of 7.08 km^{2} (2.73 sq mi). Of this area, 5.15 km^{2} (1.99 mi^{2}) or 72.8% is used for agricultural purposes, while 1.18 km^{2} (0.46 mi^{2}) or 16.7% is forested. Of the rest of the land, 0.54 km^{2} (0.21 mi^{2}) or 7.6% is settled (buildings or roads), 0.09 km^{2} (22 acres) or 1.3% is either rivers or lakes and 0.1 km^{2} (25 acres) or 1.4% is unproductive land.

Of the built up area, housing and buildings made up 4.5% and transportation infrastructure made up 3.0%. Out of the forested land, all of the forested land area is covered with heavy forests. Of the agricultural land, 62.4% is used for growing crops and 9.8% is pastures. Of the water in the municipality, 0.3% is in lakes and 1.0% is in rivers and streams.

The municipality is located in the upper Limpach valley. It consists of the village of Wengi and the hamlets of Scheunenberg, Waltwil and Janzenhaus.

On 31 December 2009 Amtsbezirk Büren, the municipality's former district, was dissolved. On the following day, 1 January 2010, it joined the newly created Verwaltungskreis Seeland.

== Coat of arms ==
The blazon of the municipal coat of arms is Argent three Roses Gules barbed and seeded proper in Pale.

== Demographics ==
Wengi has a population (as of December 2020) of 630. As of 2010, 8.1% of the population are resident foreign nationals. Over the last 10 years (2000–2010) the population has changed at a rate of 12.2%. Migration accounted for 7.1%, while births and deaths accounted for 6.4%.

Most of the population (as of 2000) speaks German (530 or 96.0%) as their first language, French is the second most common (10 or 1.8%) and Portuguese is the third (4 or 0.7%).

As of 2008, the population was 52.2% male and 47.8% female. The population was made up of 293 Swiss men (47.6% of the population) and 28 (4.6%) non-Swiss men. There were 272 Swiss women (44.2%) and 22 (3.6%) non-Swiss women. Of the population in the municipality, 207 or about 37.5% were born in Wengi and lived there in 2000. There were 217 or 39.3% who were born in the same canton, while 82 or 14.9% were born somewhere else in Switzerland, and 36 or 6.5% were born outside of Switzerland.

As of 2010, children and teenagers (0–19 years old) make up 23.4% of the population, while adults (20–64 years old) make up 61.6% and seniors (over 64 years old) make up 15%.

As of 2000, there were 224 people who were single and never married in the municipality. There were 277 married individuals, 32 widows or widowers and 19 individuals who are divorced.

As of 2000, there were 51 households that consist of only one person and 17 households with five or more people. In 2000, a total of 208 apartments (95.4% of the total) were permanently occupied, while 5 apartments (2.3%) were seasonally occupied and 5 apartments (2.3%) were empty. As of 2010, the construction rate of new housing units was 1.6 new units per 1000 residents. The vacancy rate for the municipality, in 2011, was 2.94%.

The historical population is given in the following chart:

== Politics ==
In the 2011 federal election the most popular party was the SVP which received 43% of the vote. The next three most popular parties were the BDP Party (18%), the SPS (10%) and the Green Party (8.2%). In the federal election, a total of 242 votes were cast, and the voter turnout was 55.4%.

== Economy ==
As of 2011, Wengi had an unemployment rate of 1.59%. As of 2008, there were a total of 161 people employed in the municipality. Of these, there were 88 people employed in the primary economic sector and about 29 businesses involved in this sector. 19 people were employed in the secondary sector and there were 6 businesses in this sector. 54 people were employed in the tertiary sector, with 17 businesses in this sector.

In 2008 there were a total of 121 full-time equivalent jobs. The number of jobs in the primary sector was 60, all of which were in agriculture. The number of jobs in the secondary sector was 16 of which 14 or (87.5%) were in manufacturing and 2 (12.5%) were in construction. The number of jobs in the tertiary sector was 45. In the tertiary sector; 8 or 17.8% were in wholesale or retail sales or the repair of motor vehicles, 12 or 26.7% were in the movement and storage of goods, 11 or 24.4% were in a hotel or restaurant, 2 or 4.4% were technical professionals or scientists, 5 or 11.1% were in education.

In 2000, there were 28 workers who commuted into the municipality and 195 workers who commuted away. The municipality is a net exporter of workers, with about 7.0 workers leaving the municipality for every one entering. Of the working population, 6.7% used public transportation to get to work, and 57% used a private car.

== Religion ==
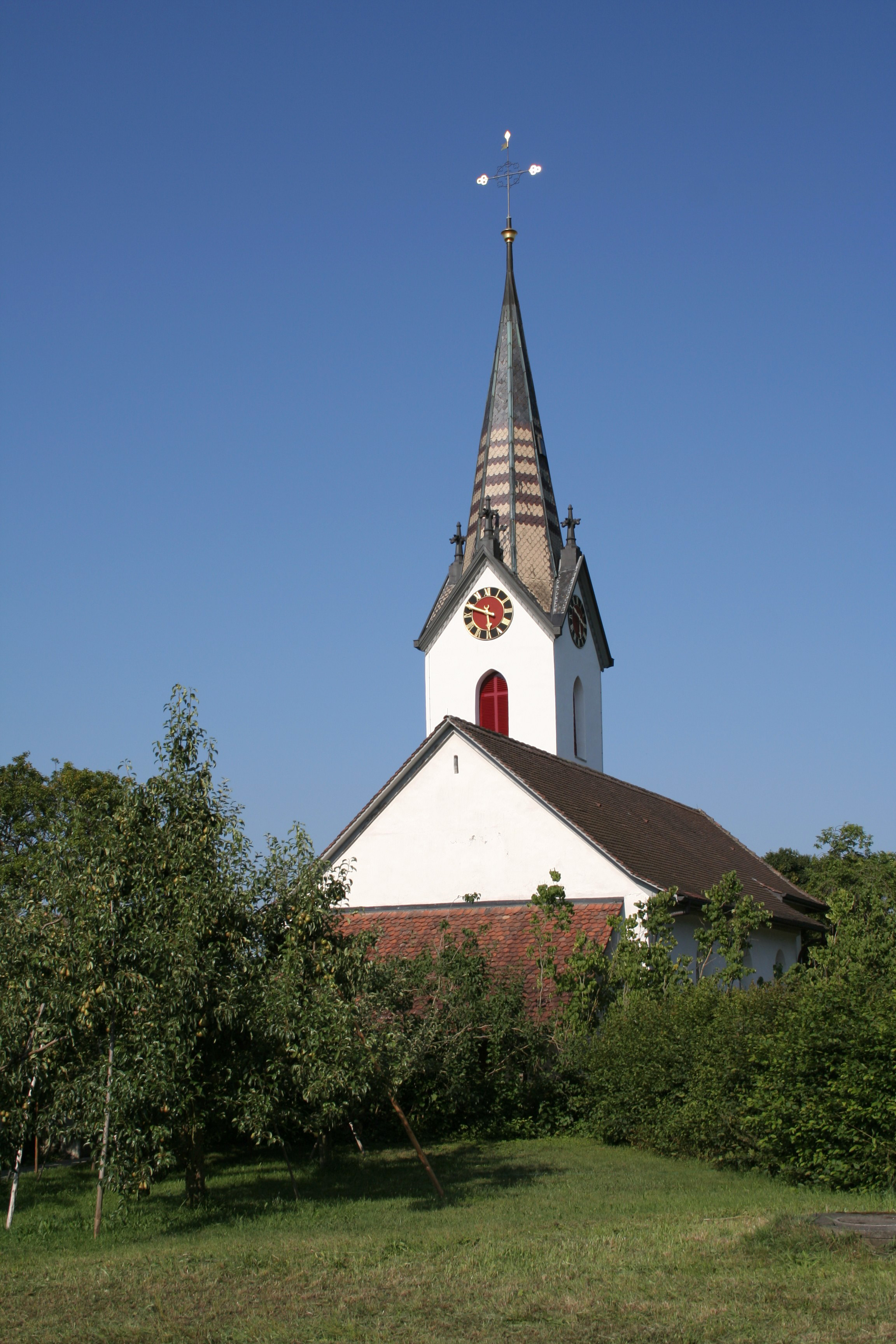
Wengi's Swiss Reformed church

From the 2000 census, 39 or 7.1% were Roman Catholic, while 441 or 79.9% belonged to the Swiss Reformed Church. Of the rest of the population, there were 3 members of an Orthodox church (or about 0.54% of the population), and there were 18 individuals (or about 3.26% of the population) who belonged to another Christian church. There was 1 individual who was Islamic. 45 (or about 8.15% of the population) belonged to no church, are agnostic or atheist, and 14 individuals (or about 2.54% of the population) did not answer the question.

== Education ==
In Wengi about 213 or (38.6%) of the population have completed non-mandatory upper secondary education, and 83 or (15.0%) have completed additional higher education (either university or a Fachhochschule). Of the 83 who completed tertiary schooling, 65.1% were Swiss men, 30.1% were Swiss women.

The Canton of Bern school system provides one year of non-obligatory Kindergarten, followed by six years of Primary school. This is followed by three years of obligatory lower Secondary school where the students are separated according to ability and aptitude. Following the lower Secondary students may attend additional schooling or they may enter an apprenticeship.

During the 2009–10 school year, there were a total of 73 students attending classes in Wengi. There was one kindergarten class with a total of 14 students in the municipality. Of the kindergarten students, 14.3% were permanent or temporary residents of Switzerland (not citizens) and 14.3% have a different mother language than the classroom language. The municipality had 3 primary classes and 59 students. Of the primary students, 6.8% were permanent or temporary residents of Switzerland (not citizens) and 3.4% have a different mother language than the classroom language.

As of 2000, there were 13 students in Wengi who came from another municipality, while 36 residents attended schools outside the municipality.
