= Grossaffoltern =

- Municipality
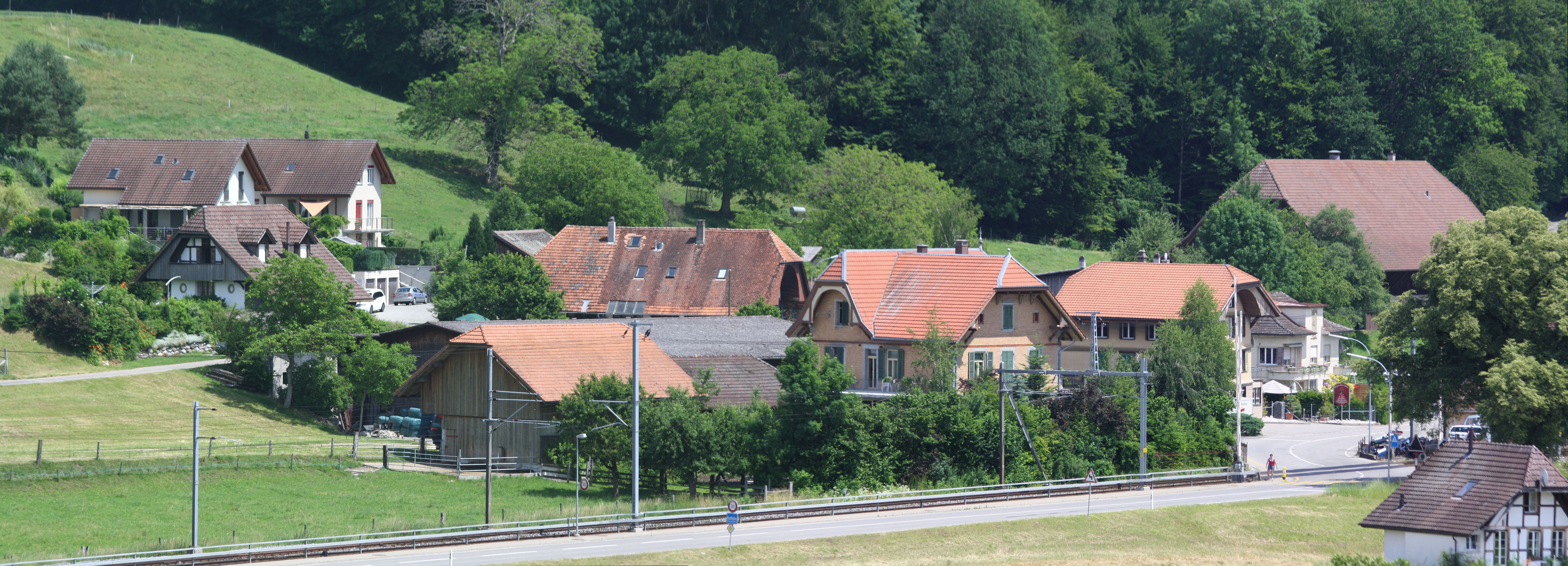
- Grossaffoltern-Kosthofen

- Flag Coat of arms
- Location of Grossaffoltern
- Location within Switzerland Location within Canton of Bern
- Coordinates: 47°4′N 7°21′E
- Country: Switzerland
- Canton: Bern
- District: Seeland

Area
  - Total: 15.06 km^{2} (5.81 sq mi)
- Elevation: 511 m (1,677 ft)

Population (December 2020)
  - Total: 3,033
  - Density: 201.4/km^{2} (521.6/sq mi)
- Time zone: UTC+01:00 (CET)
  - Summer (DST): UTC+02:00 (CEST)
- Postal code: 3257
- SFOS number: 303
- ISO 3166 code: CH-BE
- Localities: Ammerzwil, Kaltenbrunnen, Kosthofen, Ottiswil, Suberg, Vorimholz, Weingarten
- Surrounded by: Diessbach bei Büren, Lyss, Rapperswil, Schüpfen, Seedorf, Wengi
- Twin towns: Horsovsky Tyn (Czech Republic)
- Website: grossaffoltern.ch

Grossaffoltern is a municipality in the Seeland administrative district in the canton of Bern in Switzerland. It is known for its stork colony.

== History ==
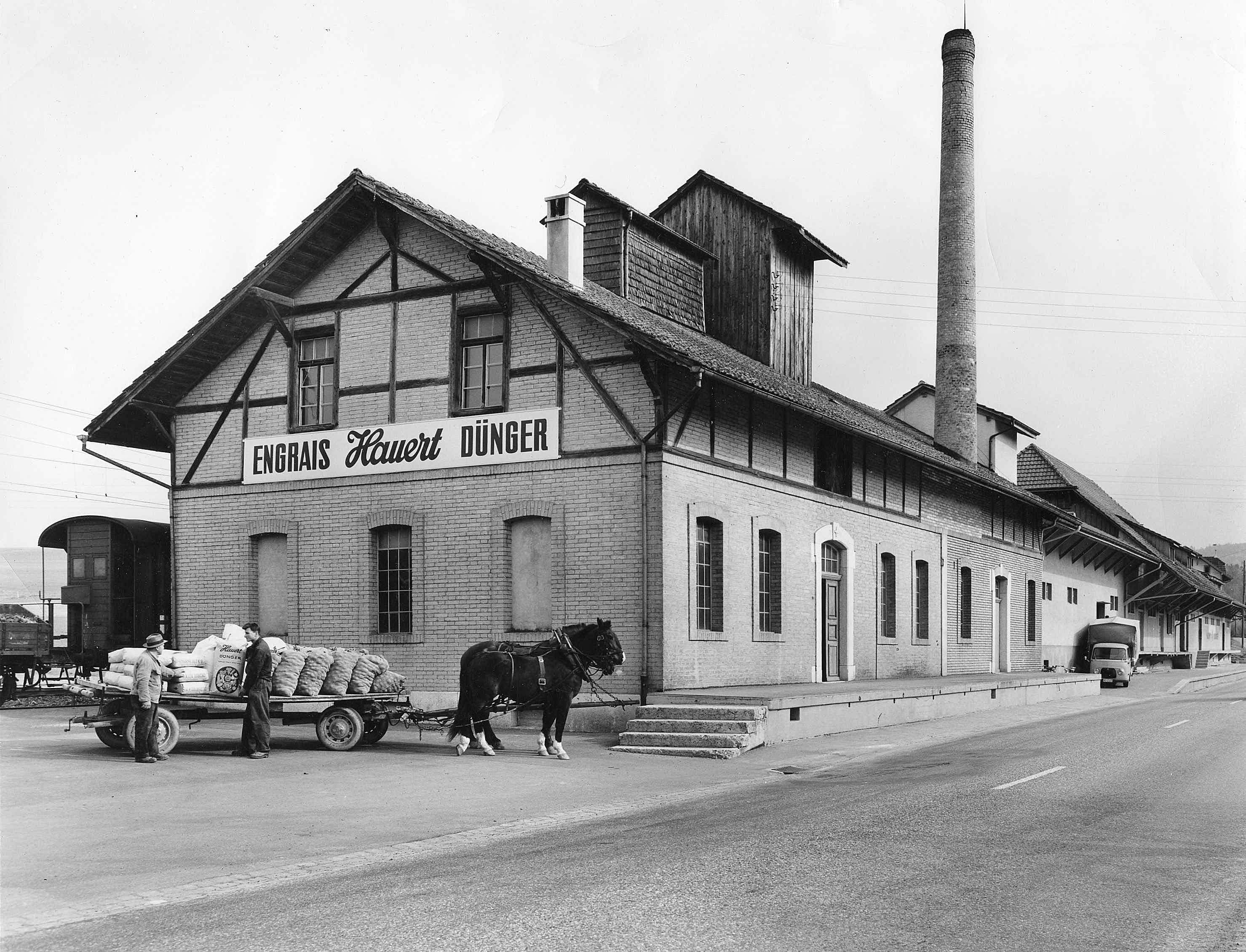
Hauert's fertilizer factory around 1960

Grossaffoltern is first mentioned in 1216 as Affoltron.

The oldest evidence of humans in the Grossaffoltern area are neolithic objects at Vorimholz, an Early Bronze Age ax blade depot at Munimatte and Bronze Age items at Kosthofen. There are at least 38 Hallstatt era grave mounds scattered around the municipality. The area was also inhabited during the Roman era and the Early Middle Ages. During the Middle Ages it was owned by the House of Zähringen until that family died out, when it was inherited by the Kyburgs. Under the Zähringens and the Kyburgs, during the 13th and 14th centuries, it was part of the district of Oltigen. In 1412, Grossaffoltern and the surrounding villages came under Bernese control. It was originally part of the bailiwick of Oltigen until that was dissolved in 1483, when it became part of the bailiwick of Aarberg allocated. Under the Helvetic Republic, in 1798, Grossaffoltern was in the Zollikofen district before switching back to the Aarberg district in 1803.

The village church of St. Stephen was first mentioned in 1275. The current church building is from 1510 to 1524, though it was built on top of the foundations of two 12th or 13th century churches. The church tower is from the 14th century. In 1383 it was given by Anna of Kyburg-Nidau to the monastery of Klingental near Basel. The monastery sold the church in 1416 to the Abbey of Frienisberg. Under Frienisberg it became the parish church of the local parish in 1451. The parish came under Bernese control in 1528.

Even today, the economy of municipality remains strongly agrarian. In 1835-44 the cantonal road from Bern to Biel/Bienne was built passing through Grossaffoltern. This was followed in 1864 by a railroad and in 1983 by a highway, all of which boosted the local economy. Due to the good transportation connections, starting the 1960s, the number of commuters living in Grossaffoltern rose sharply. In 1967, Grossaffoltern and six surrounding villages merged into a single municipality to streamline government and centralize services.

== Geography ==
Grossaffoltern has an area of 15.08 km^{2} (5.82 sq mi). Of this area, 9.41 km^{2} (3.63 mi^{2}) or 62.6% is used for agricultural purposes, while 3.93 km^{2} (1.52 mi^{2}) or 26.1% is forested. Of the rest of the land, 1.64 km^{2} (0.63 mi^{2}) or 10.9% is settled (buildings or roads), 0.1 km^{2} (25 acres) or 0.7% is either rivers or lakes and 0.02 km^{2} (4.9 acres) or 0.1% is unproductive land.

Of the built up area, housing and buildings made up 4.9% and transportation infrastructure made up 4.9%. Out of the forested land, all of the forested land area is covered with heavy forests. Of the agricultural land, 49.0% is used for growing crops and 11.8% is pastures, while 1.8% is used for orchards or vine crops. All the water in the municipality is flowing water.

The municipality is located on the western edge of the Rapperswil Plateau in the Lyssbach valley. It consists of seven villages; the religious and administrative center of Grossaffoltern, Ammerzwil, Vorimholz, Wingarte, Suberg, Kosthofen and Ottiswil as well as a number of scattered farm houses.

== Coat of arms ==
The blazon of the municipal coat of arms is Or an Apple tree Vert issuant from a base of the same and fructed Gules.

== Demographics ==
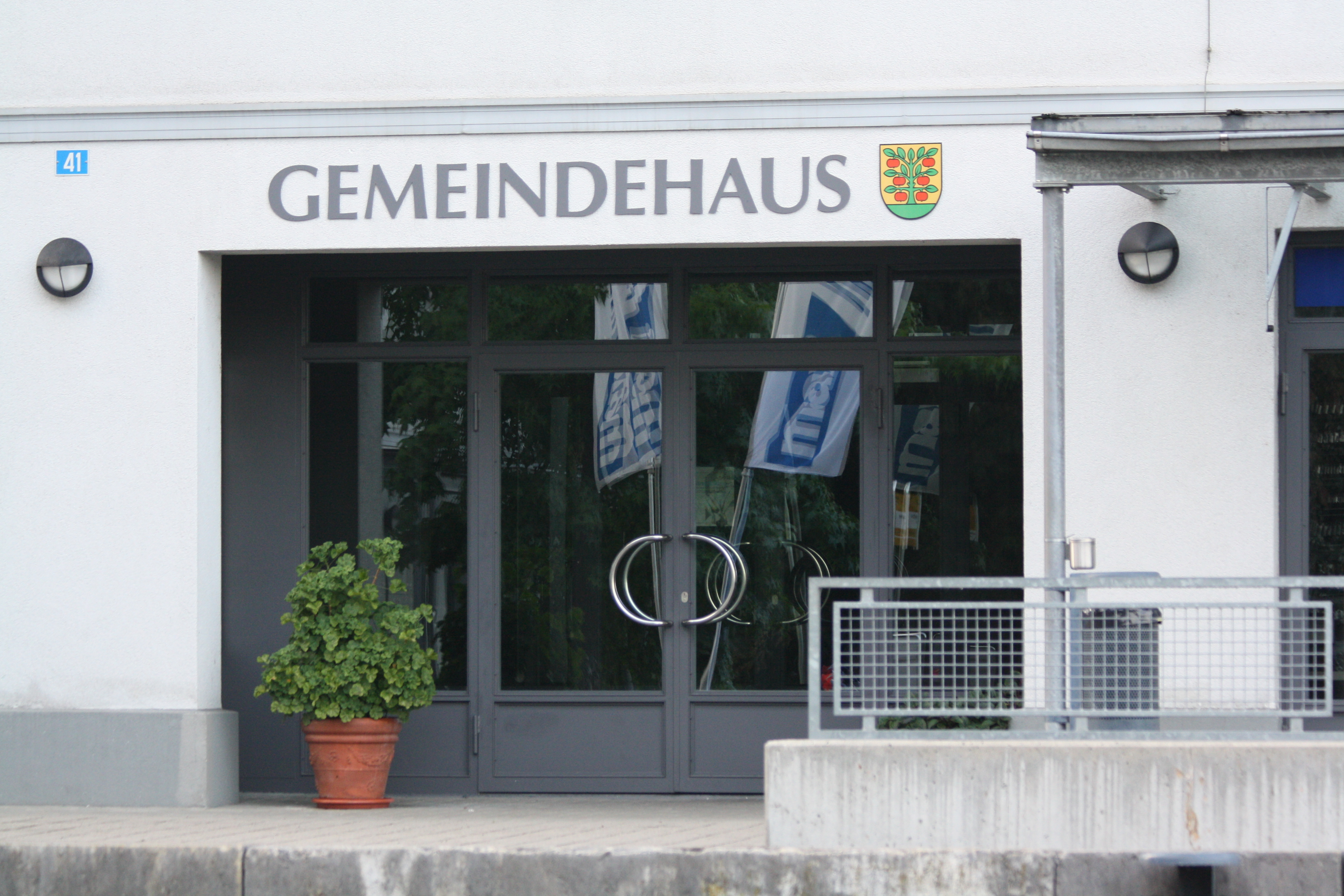
Grossaffoltern municipal building

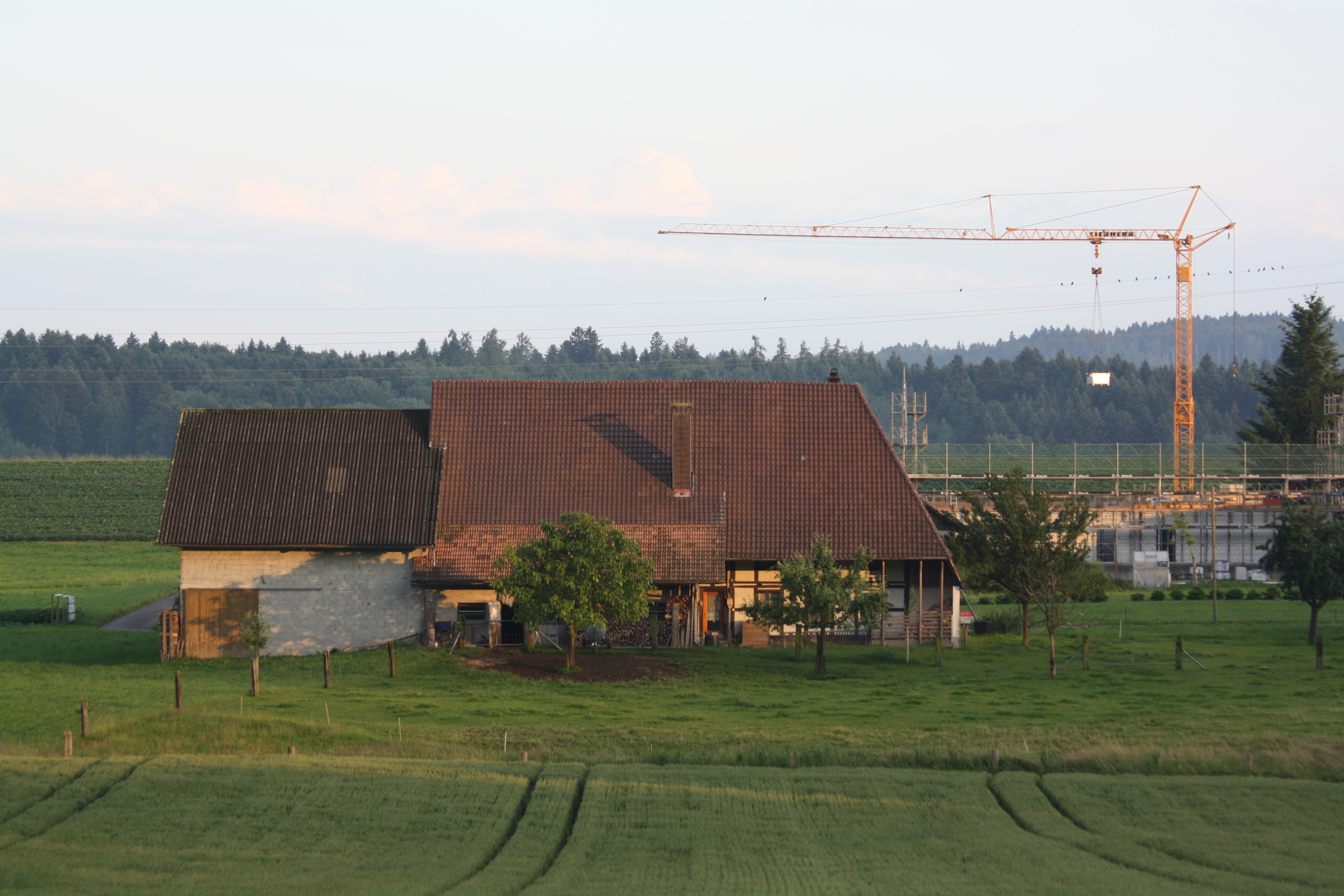
Farm house near the village

Grossaffoltern has a population (as of December 2020) of 3,033. As of 2010, 4.6% of the population are resident foreign nationals. Over the last 10 years (2000–2010) the population has changed at a rate of -0.2%. Migration accounted for 0.3%, while births and deaths accounted for 1.8%.

Most of the population (as of 2000) speaks German (2,700 or 96.4%) as their first language, French is the second most common (23 or 0.8%) and English is the third (16 or 0.6%). There are 12 people who speak Italian.

As of 2008, the population was 50.6% male and 49.4% female. The population was made up of 1,336 Swiss men (48.0% of the population) and 72 (2.6%) non-Swiss men. There were 1,317 Swiss women (47.3%) and 5 (0.2%) non-Swiss women. Of the population in the municipality, 846 or about 30.2% were born in Grossaffoltern and lived there in 2000. There were 1,283 or 45.8% who were born in the same canton, while 413 or 14.8% were born somewhere else in Switzerland, and 169 or 6.0% were born outside of Switzerland.

As of 2000, children and teenagers (0–19 years old) make up 25.5% of the population, while adults (20–64 years old) make up 60.7% and seniors (over 64 years old) make up 13.8%.

As of 2000, there were 1,135 people who were single and never married in the municipality. There were 1,421 married individuals, 136 widows or widowers and 108 individuals who are divorced.

As of 2000, there were 1,105 private households in the municipality, and an average of 2.5 persons per household. There were 256 households that consist of only one person and 79 households with five or more people. In 2000, a total of 1,075 apartments (91.9% of the total) were permanently occupied, while 63 apartments (5.4%) were seasonally occupied and 32 apartments (2.7%) were empty. As of 2009, the construction rate of new housing units was 1.8 new units per 1000 residents. The vacancy rate for the municipality, in 2010, was 2.27%.

The historical population is given in the following chart:

== Politics ==
In the 2007 federal election the most popular party was the SVP which received 37.49% of the vote. The next three most popular parties were the SPS (21.18%), the FDP (14.37%) and the Green Party (12.78%). In the federal election, a total of 1,053 votes were cast, and the voter turnout was 48.1%.

== Economy ==
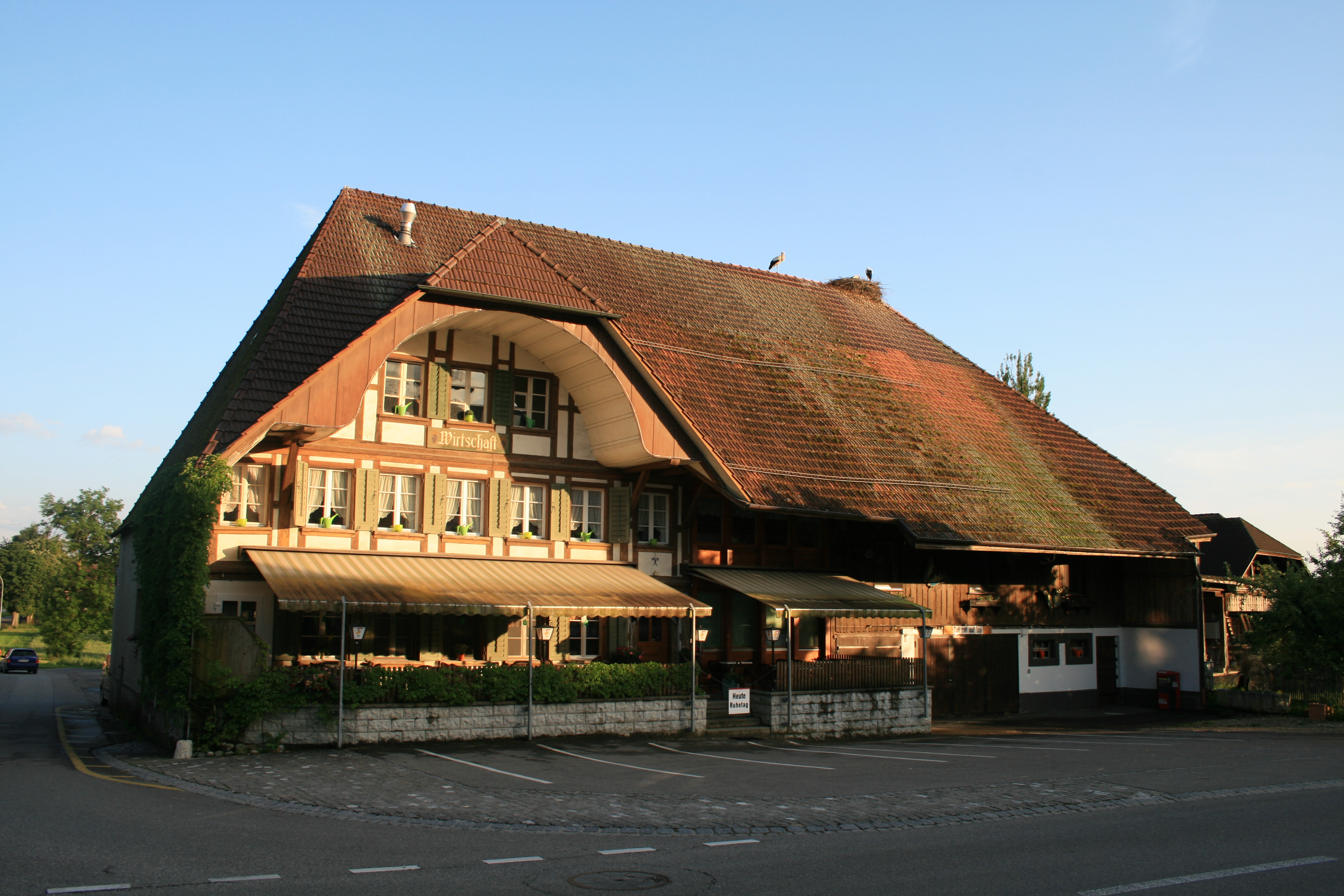
Gasthaus Traube in Grossaffoltern

As of 2010, Grossaffoltern had an unemployment rate of 0.8%. As of 2008, there were 182 people employed in the primary economic sector and about 61 businesses involved in this sector. 165 people were employed in the secondary sector and there were 34 businesses in this sector. 211 people were employed in the tertiary sector, with 63 businesses in this sector.

In 2008 the total number of full-time equivalent jobs was 408. The number of jobs in the primary sector was 115, of which 113 were in agriculture and 2 were in forestry or lumber production. The number of jobs in the secondary sector was 144 of which 69 or (47.9%) were in manufacturing and 75 (52.1%) were in construction. The number of jobs in the tertiary sector was 149. In the tertiary sector; 38 or 25.5% were in wholesale or retail sales or the repair of motor vehicles, 8 or 5.4% were in the movement and storage of goods, 28 or 18.8% were in a hotel or restaurant, 4 or 2.7% were in the information industry, 16 or 10.7% were technical professionals or scientists, 21 or 14.1% were in education and 3 or 2.0% were in health care.

In 2000, there were 153 workers who commuted into the municipality and 1,118 workers who commuted away. The municipality is a net exporter of workers, with about 7.3 workers leaving the municipality for every one entering. Of the working population, 16.7% used public transportation to get to work, and 57.9% used a private car.

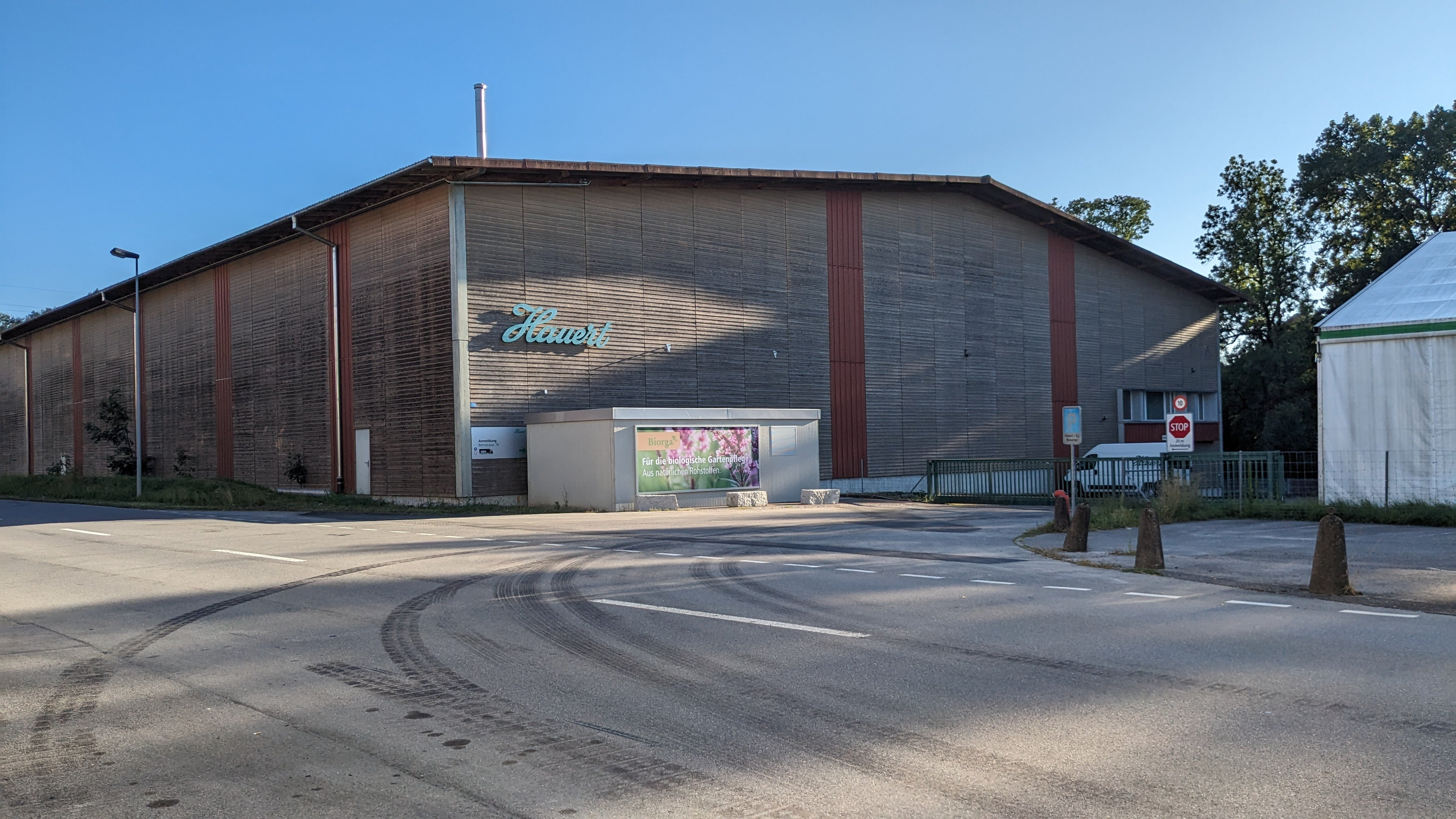
Fertilizer-factory Hauert located in Suberg.

The factory of the fertilizer company Hauert is located in Grossaffoltern.

== Religion ==
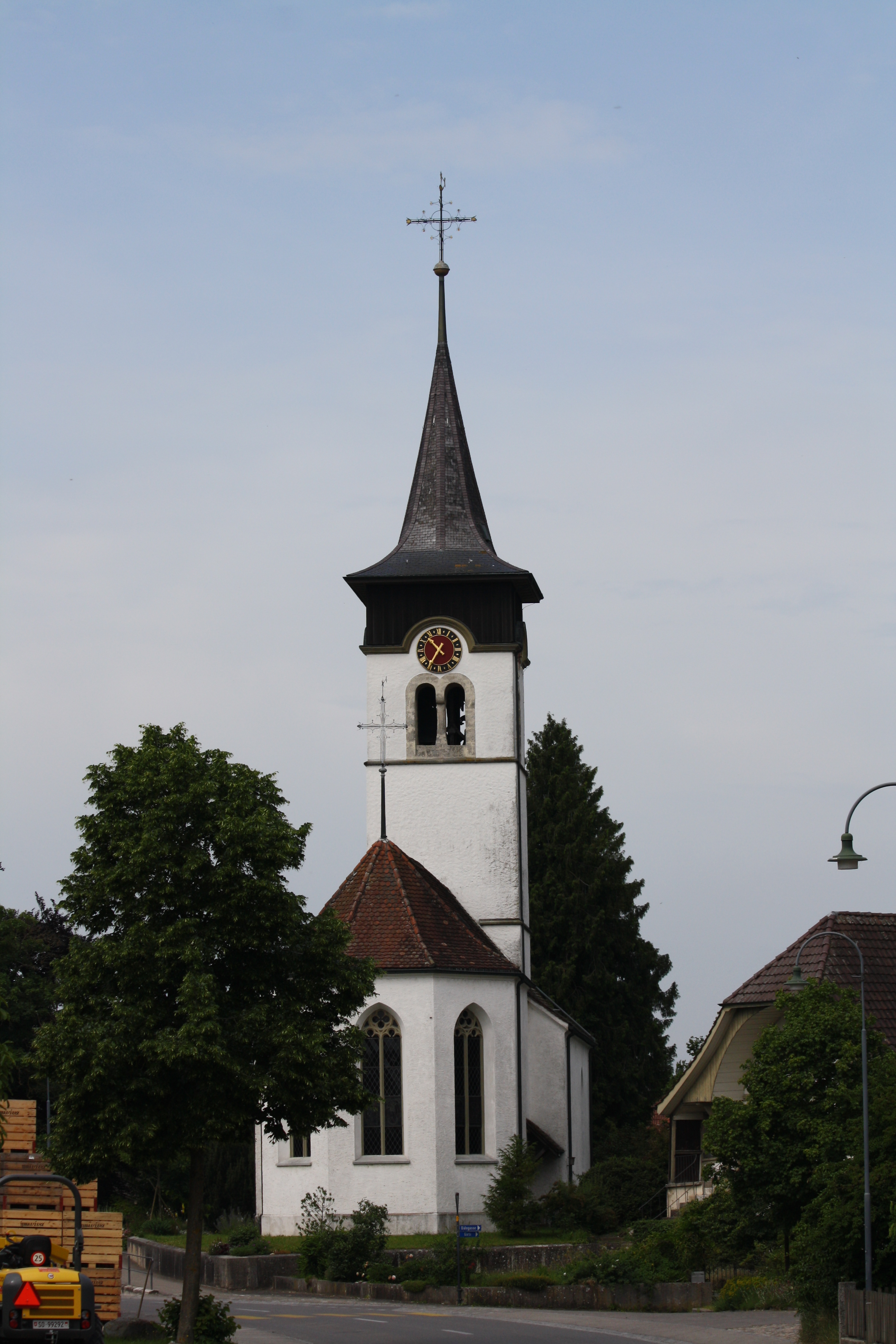
Village Swiss Reformed church

From the 2000 census, 2,191 or 78.3% belonged to the Swiss Reformed Church, while 248 or 8.9% were Roman Catholic. Of the rest of the population, there were 11 members of an Orthodox church (or about 0.39% of the population), there were 2 individuals (or about 0.07% of the population) who belonged to the Christian Catholic Church, and there were 144 individuals (or about 5.14% of the population) who belonged to another Christian church. There were 13 (or about 0.46% of the population) who were Muslim. There were 3 individuals who were Hindu. 187 (or about 6.68% of the population) belonged to no church, are agnostic or atheist, and 72 individuals (or about 2.57% of the population) did not answer the question.

== Education ==
In Grossaffoltern about 1,206 or (43.1%) of the population have completed non-mandatory upper secondary education, and 366 or (13.1%) have completed additional higher education (either university or a Fachhochschule). Of the 366 who completed tertiary schooling, 69.4% were Swiss men, 24.9% were Swiss women, 3.6% were non-Swiss men and 2.2% were non-Swiss women.

The Canton of Bern school system provides one year of non-obligatory Kindergarten, followed by six years of Primary school. This is followed by three years of obligatory lower Secondary school where the students are separated according to ability and aptitude. Following the lower Secondary students may attend additional schooling or they may enter an apprenticeship.

During the 2009–10 school year, there were a total of 226 students attending classes in Grossaffoltern. There were 3 kindergarten classes with a total of 48 students in the municipality. Of the kindergarten students, 10.4% were permanent or temporary residents of Switzerland (not citizens) and 2.1% have a different mother language than the classroom language. The municipality had 9 primary classes and 178 students. Of the primary students, 5.1% were permanent or temporary residents of Switzerland (not citizens) and 12.4% have a different mother language than the classroom language. As of 2000, there were 4 students in Grossaffoltern who came from another municipality, while 167 residents attended schools outside the municipality.

Grossaffoltern is home to the Bibliothek Grossaffoltern library. The library has (as of 2008) 7,624 books or other media, and loaned out 14,646 items in the same year. It was open a total of 165 days with average of 8 hours per week during that year.
