= Buchegg =

- Municipality
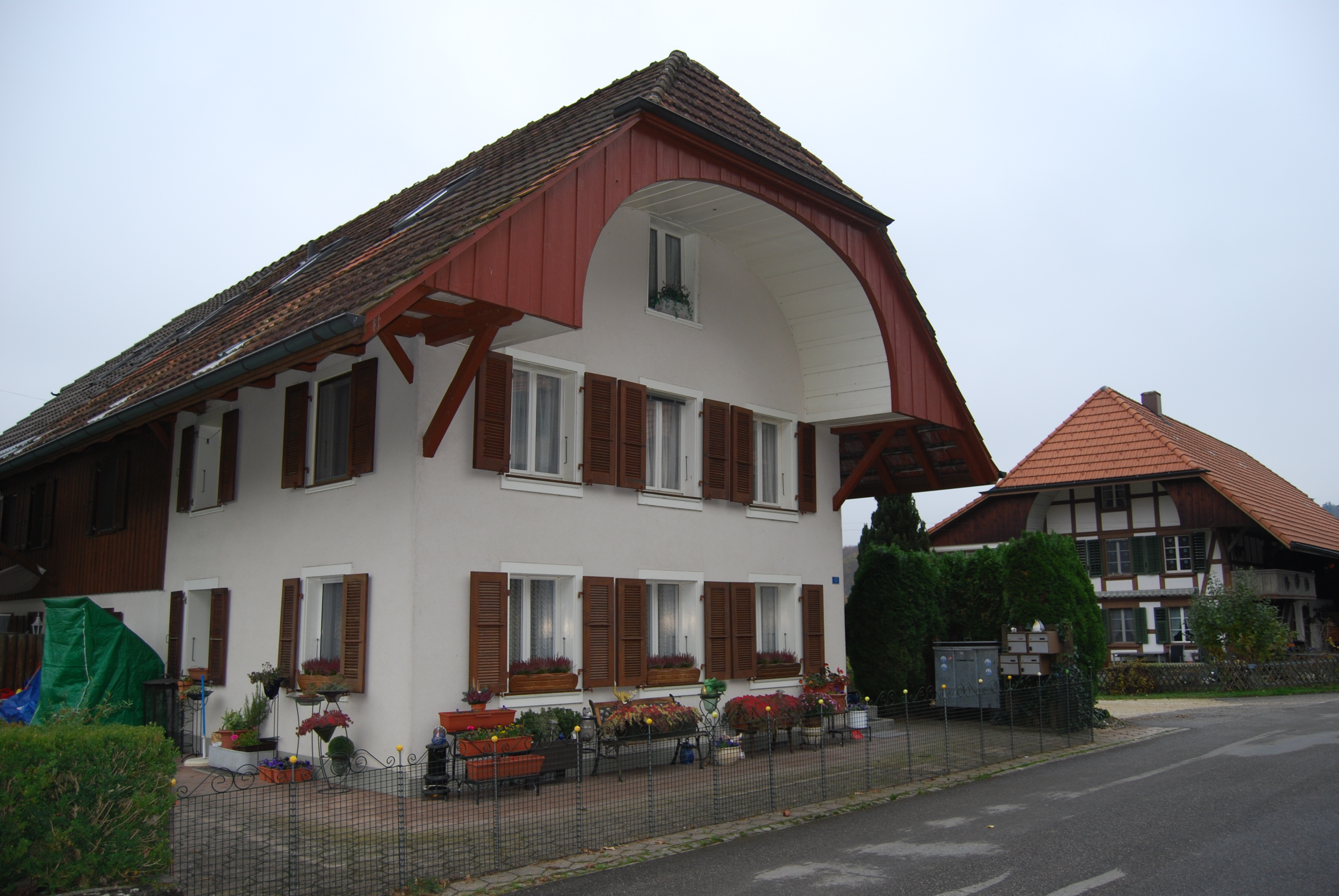
- House in Küttigkofen village

- Coat of arms
- Location of Buchegg
- Location within Switzerland Location within Canton of Solothurn
- Coordinates: 47°9′N 7°31′E
- Country: Switzerland
- Canton: Solothurn
- District: Bucheggberg

Area
  - Total: 22.64 km^{2} (8.74 sq mi)

Population (Dec 2011)
  - Total: 2,501
  - Density: 110.5/km^{2} (286.1/sq mi)
- Time zone: UTC+01:00 (CET)
  - Summer (DST): UTC+02:00 (CEST)
- SFOS number: 2465
- ISO 3166 code: CH-SO
- Surrounded by: Bätterkinden (BE), Lüterkofen-Ichertswil, Lüterswil-Gächliwil, Unterramsern
- Website: http://www.buchegg-so.ch/

Buchegg is a municipality in the district of Bucheggberg, in the canton of Solothurn, Switzerland. On 1 January 2014 the former municipalities of Tscheppach, Brügglen, Aetingen, Aetigkofen, Bibern (SO), Gossliwil, Hessigkofen, Mühledorf (SO), Küttigkofen and Kyburg-Buchegg merged into the new municipality of Buchegg. On 1 January 2024 the former municipality of Lüterswil-Gächliwil merged into the municipality of Buchegg.

== History ==
Aetigkofen is first mentioned in 1034 as Etikhouen. Aetingen is first mentioned in 1267 as Etinge. Bibern is first mentioned in 1366 as ze Bibron. Brügglen is first mentioned in 1249 as Bruglon. Gossliwil is first mentioned in 1246 as Gosseriswile. In 1276 it was mentioned as Goselwyl. Hessigkofen is first mentioned in 1034 as Esikouen. Küttigkofen is first mentioned in 1316 as obrenchúttenkouen. Kyburg-Buchegg is first mentioned in 1175 as Ernaldus de Boucecca. Mühledorf is first mentioned around 1264 as Mulidorf though this is from a copy from 1415-20. In 1276 it was mentioned as Mvlidorf. Tscheppach is first mentioned in 1334 as Scheppach.

== Geography ==
The former municipalities that now make up Buchegg have a total combined area of 22.59 km^{2} (8.72 sq mi).

== Demographics ==
The total population of Buchegg (as of December 2020) is 2,522.

== Historic population ==
The historical population is given in the following chart:

== Sights ==
The villages of Aetingen, Gossliwil, Hessigkofen, Mühledorf and Tscheppach are part of the Inventory of Swiss Heritage Sites.

== Weather ==
Hessigkofen has an average of 130.6 days of rain or snow per year and on average receives 1,112 mm (43.8 in) of precipitation. The wettest month is August during which time Hessigkofen receives an average of 124 mm (4.9 in) of rain or snow. During this month there is precipitation for an average of 11.2 days. The month with the most days of precipitation is May, with an average of 12.8, but with only 103 mm (4.1 in) of rain or snow. The driest month of the year is March with an average of 76 mm (3.0 in) of precipitation over 12.1 days.
