= Tscheppach =

- Former municipality
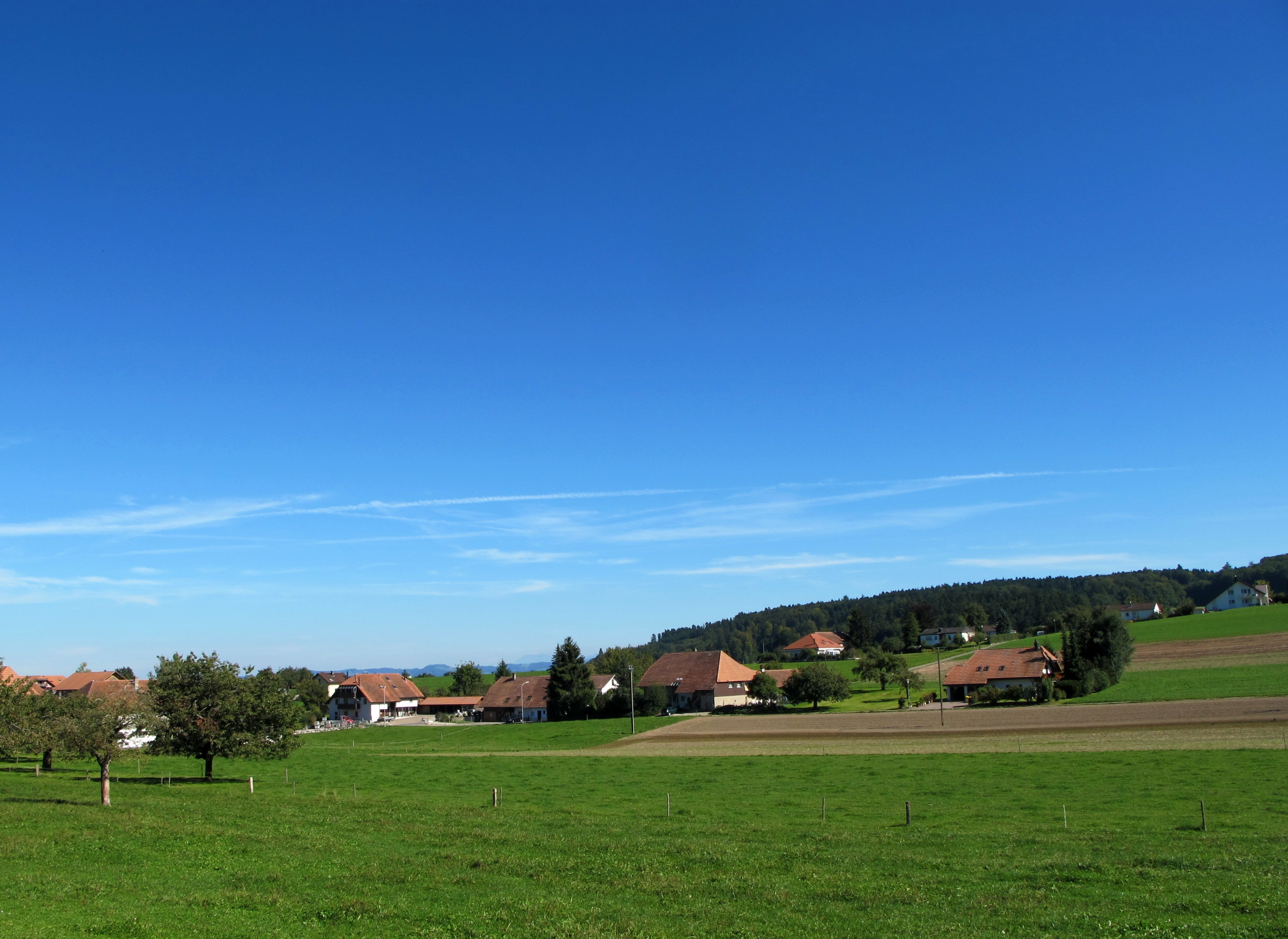
- Tscheppach village

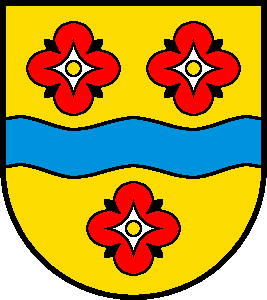
- Coat of arms
- Location of Tscheppach
- Location within Switzerland Location within Canton of Solothurn
- Coordinates: 47°9′N 7°29′E
- Country: Switzerland
- Canton: Solothurn
- District: Bucheggberg

Area
  - Total: 1.84 km^{2} (0.71 sq mi)
- Elevation: 558 m (1,831 ft)

Population (Dec 2011)
  - Total: 195
  - Density: 106/km^{2} (274/sq mi)
- Time zone: UTC+01:00 (CET)
  - Summer (DST): UTC+02:00 (CEST)
- Postal code: 4576
- SFOS number: 2462
- ISO 3166 code: CH-SO
- Surrounded by: Bibern, Brügglen, Hessigkofen, Leuzigen (BE), Lüterkofen-Ichertswil, Mühledorf
- Website: www.buchegg-so.ch

Tscheppach is a former municipality in the district of Bucheggberg, in the canton of Solothurn, Switzerland. On 1 January 2014 the former municipalities of Tscheppach, Brügglen, Aetingen, Aetigkofen, Bibern (SO), Gossliwil, Hessigkofen, Mühledorf (SO), Küttigkofen, Kyburg-Buchegg merged into the new municipality of Buchegg.

== Geography ==
Before the merger, Tscheppach had a total area of 1.8 km^{2} (0.69 mi^{2}). Of this area, 1.08 km^{2} (0.42 sq mi) or 58.7% is used for agricultural purposes, while 0.6 km^{2} (0.23 sq mi) or 32.6% is forested. Of the rest of the land, 0.15 km^{2} (37 acres) or 8.2% is settled (buildings or roads), 0.01 km^{2} (2.5 acres) or 0.5% is either rivers or lakes.

Of the built up area, housing and buildings made up 3.3% and transportation infrastructure made up 4.9%. Out of the forested land, all of the forested land area is covered with heavy forests. Of the agricultural land, 38.6% is used for growing crops and 19.0% is pastures, while 1.1% is used for orchards or vine crops. All the water in the municipality is flowing water.

== Coat of arms ==
The blazon of the municipal coat of arms is Or a Bar wavy Azure between three Quatrefoil Roses Gules with the Core Argent barbed and seeded proper.

== Demographics ==
Tscheppach had a population (as of 2011) of 195. As of 2008, 5.5% of the population are resident foreign nationals. Over the last 10 years (1999–2009 ) the population has changed at a rate of 4.3%.

Most of the population (as of 2000) speaks German (188 or 98.9%) with the rest speaking Italian

As of 2008, the gender distribution of the population was 51.6% male and 48.4% female. The population was made up of 96 Swiss men (50.0% of the population) and 3 (1.6%) non-Swiss men. There were 92 Swiss women (47.9%) and 1 (0.5%) non-Swiss women. Of the population in the municipality 71 or about 37.4% were born in Tscheppach and lived there in 2000. There were 47 or 24.7% who were born in the same canton, while 51 or 26.8% were born somewhere else in Switzerland, and 17 or 8.9% were born outside of Switzerland.

In 2008 there was 1 live birth to Swiss citizens and were 2 deaths of Swiss citizens. Ignoring immigration and emigration, the population of Swiss citizens decreased by 1 while the foreign population remained the same. There was 1 Swiss man who emigrated from Switzerland. The total Swiss population change in 2008 (from all sources, including moves across municipal borders) was an increase of 1 and the non-Swiss population decreased by 1 people. This represents a population growth rate of 0.0%.

The age distribution, as of 2000, in Tscheppach is; 13 children or 6.8% of the population are between 0 and 6 years old and 24 teenagers or 12.6% are between 7 and 19. Of the adult population, 11 people or 5.8% of the population are between 20 and 24 years old. 64 people or 33.7% are between 25 and 44, and 61 people or 32.1% are between 45 and 64. The senior population distribution is 14 people or 7.4% of the population are between 65 and 79 years old and there are 3 people or 1.6% who are over 80.

As of 2000, there were 71 people who were single and never married in the municipality. There were 104 married individuals, 6 widows or widowers and 9 individuals who are divorced.

In 2000 there were 33 single family homes (or 55.0% of the total) out of a total of 60 inhabited buildings. There were 7 multi-family buildings (11.7%), along with 17 multi-purpose buildings that were mostly used for housing (28.3%) and 3 other use buildings (commercial or industrial) that also had some housing (5.0%).

In 2000 there were 76 apartments in the municipality. Of these apartments, a total of 75 apartments (98.7% of the total) were permanently occupied, while 1 apartments (1.3%) were seasonally occupied. As of 2009, the construction rate of new housing units was 0 new units per 1000 residents. The vacancy rate for the municipality, in 2010, was 0%.

The historical population is given in the following chart:

== Politics ==
In the 2007 federal election the most popular party was the SVP which received 37.5% of the vote. The next three most popular parties were the FDP (29.69%), the SP (13.54%) and the CVP (11.46%). In the federal election, a total of 84 votes were cast, and the voter turnout was 56.0%.

== Economy ==
As of 2010, Tscheppach had an unemployment rate of 3.8%. As of 2008, there were 13 people employed in the primary economic sector and about 6 businesses involved in this sector. 15 people were employed in the secondary sector and there were 4 businesses in this sector. 37 people were employed in the tertiary sector, with 7 businesses in this sector. There were 114 residents of the municipality who were employed in some capacity, of which females made up 42.1% of the workforce.

In 2008 the total number of full-time equivalent jobs was 43. The number of jobs in the primary sector was 9, all of which were in agriculture. The number of jobs in the secondary sector was 13 of which 8 or (61.5%) were in manufacturing and 5 (38.5%) were in construction. The number of jobs in the tertiary sector was 21. In the tertiary sector; 1 was in the sale or repair of motor vehicles, 5 or 23.8% were in a hotel or restaurant, 6 or 28.6% were technical professionals or scientists, 1 was in education and 8 or 38.1% were in health care.

In 2000, there were 17 workers who commuted into the municipality and 86 workers who commuted away. The municipality is a net exporter of workers, with about 5.1 workers leaving the municipality for every one entering. Of the working population, 6.1% used public transportation to get to work, and 66.7% used a private car.

== Religion ==
From the 2000 census, 17 or 8.9% were Roman Catholic, while 125 or 65.8% belonged to the Swiss Reformed Church. Of the rest of the population, there was 1 member of an Orthodox church who belonged, there was 1 individual who belongs to the Christian Catholic Church, and there were 3 individuals (or about 1.58% of the population) who belonged to another Christian church. There was 1 person who was Buddhist. 39 (or about 20.53% of the population) belonged to no church, are agnostic or atheist, and 3 individuals (or about 1.58% of the population) did not answer the question.

== Education ==
In Tscheppach about 88 or (46.3%) of the population have completed non-mandatory upper secondary education, and 26 or (13.7%) have completed additional higher education (either university or a Fachhochschule). Of the 26 who completed tertiary schooling, 69.2% were Swiss men, 23.1% were Swiss women.

As of 2000, there were 13 students in Tscheppach who came from another municipality, while 19 residents attended schools outside the municipality.
