= Leuzigen =

- Municipality
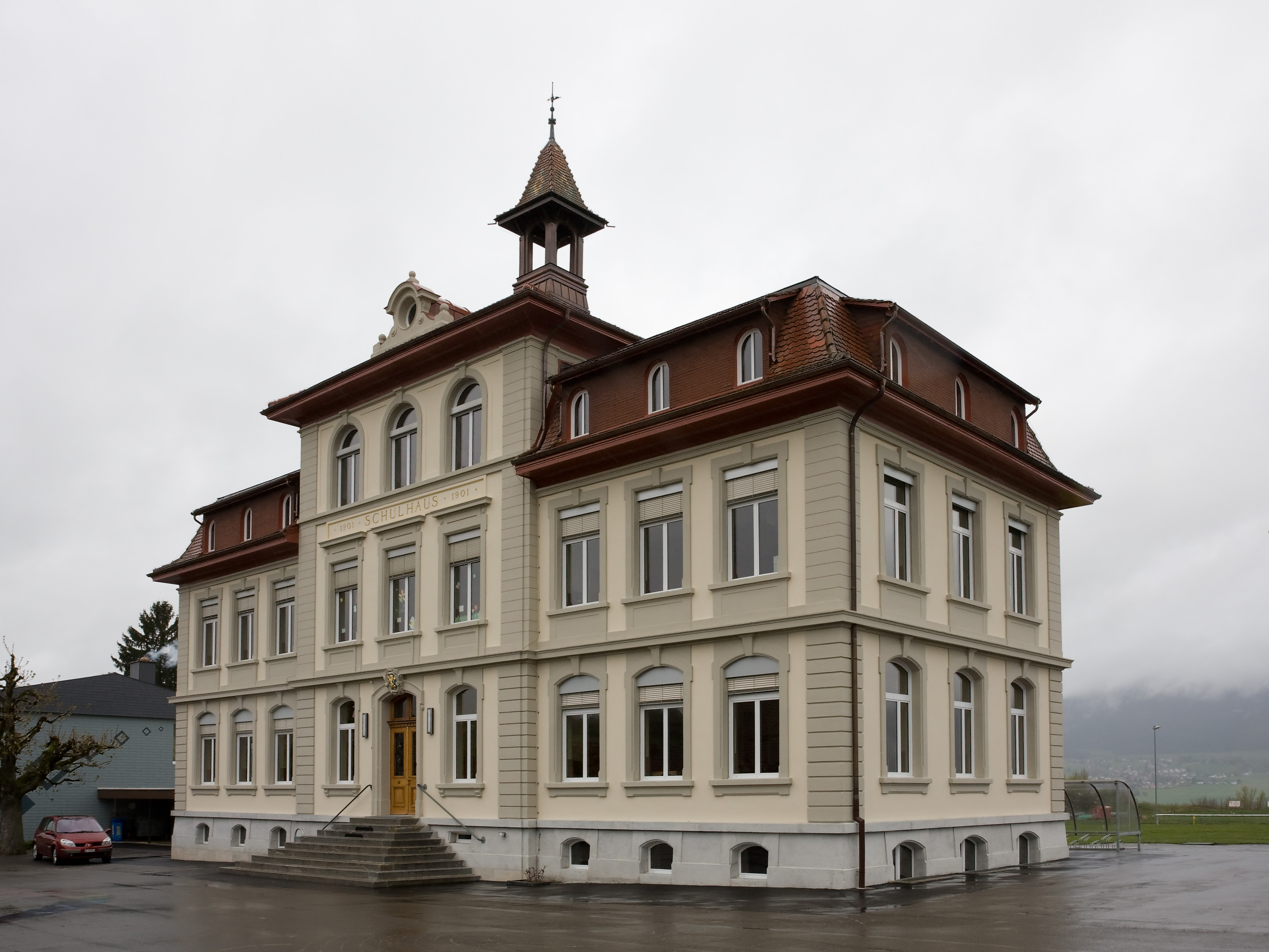
- Leuzigen village school house

- Flag Coat of arms
- Location of Leuzigen
- Location within Switzerland Location within Canton of Bern
- Coordinates: 47°11′N 7°28′E
- Country: Switzerland
- Canton: Bern
- District: Seeland

Area
  - Total: 10.3 km^{2} (4.0 sq mi)
- Elevation: 456 m (1,496 ft)

Population (December 2020)
  - Total: 1,295
  - Density: 126/km^{2} (326/sq mi)
- Time zone: UTC+01:00 (CET)
  - Summer (DST): UTC+02:00 (CEST)
- Postal code: 3297
- SFOS number: 388
- ISO 3166 code: CH-BE
- Surrounded by: Arch, Bettlach (SO), Bibern (SO), Lüterkofen-Ichertswil (SO), Nennigkofen (SO), Selzach (SO), Tscheppach (SO)
- Website: www.leuzigen.ch

Leuzigen is a municipality in the Seeland administrative district in the canton of Bern in Switzerland. The village is situated between the cities Biel/Bienne and Solothurn and borders on the river Aare.

== History ==
Aerial view (1958)

Leuzigen is first mentioned in 1235 as Loxingen. In 1270 it was mentioned as Loexigen. In old documents, the village was referred to as Loichfingen (1224), Loenzingen (1522) und Leutzigen (1661) and Leuzingen.

Archaeological excavations in the late 19th and early 20th century suggested that the area in and around Leuzigen was already populated by Celts and Romans more than 2000 years ago. In Roman times, the strategically important road connecting Avanches and Solothurn crossed present-day Leuzigen close to the old railway line. In the Middle Ages, monks founded a priory on the site where the village church is now. In 1662, a school building made of stone was constructed in the middle of the village. Although the building has long since ceased to function as a school, it is still preserved today as one of the oldest buildings in Leuzigen.

Before its integration with the canton of Bern, Leuzigen's fate was repeatedly troubled by struggles for territory amongst dukedoms and principalities, and it changed rulers a number of times.

In 1876, the railway line between Lyss and Solothurn opened and provided Leuzigen with its own train station. In the late 1990s, the service between Büren a. A. and Solothurn was shut down due to insufficient profitability and replaced by a bus line.

Before 1900, Leuzigen was one of the largest villages in the area. Although many surrounding villages have grown considerably since the 1960s, Leuzigen's population size has largely been stable for more than a century now. In the period of economic growth in the 1960s and 1970s, expanding industries in the region, such as watchmaking in Grenchen, attracted many workers. However, it had little impact on Leuzigen, which remained predominantly rural.

== Geography ==
Leuzigen has an area of 10.28 km^{2} (3.97 sq mi). Of this area, 4.69 km^{2} (1.81 mi^{2}) or 45.5% is used for agricultural purposes, while 4.1 km^{2} (1.6 mi^{2}) or 39.8% is forested. Of the rest of the land, 1.16 km^{2} (0.45 mi^{2}) or 11.3% is settled (buildings or roads), 0.34 km^{2} (0.13 mi^{2}) or 3.3% is either rivers or lakes.

Of the built up area, housing and buildings made up 4.3% and transportation infrastructure made up 4.8%. Power and water infrastructure as well as other special developed areas made up 1.3% of the area Out of the forested land, all of the forested land area is covered with heavy forests. Of the agricultural land, 34.0% is used for growing crops and 9.6% is pastures, while 1.8% is used for orchards or vine crops. All the water in the municipality is flowing water.

The municipality is located on the right bank of the Aare river on the northern slope of the Bucheggberg plateau.

On 31 December 2009 Amtsbezirk Büren, the municipality's former district, was dissolved. On the following day, 1 January 2010, it joined the newly created Verwaltungskreis Seeland.

== Coat of arms ==
The blazon of the municipal coat of arms is Azure two lions rampant combatant Or.

The design dates back to at least 1833. Contrary to popular belief, the name "Leuzigen" was not derived from the word "Löwen" (German for 'lion'), but is thought to have been derived from a Germanic last name. The name underwent a number of changes until it assumed its modern spelling.

== Demographics ==
Leuzigen has a population (as of December 2020) of 1,295. As of 2010, 4.1% of the population are resident foreign nationals. Over the last 10 years (2000-2010) the population has changed at a rate of 2.8%. Migration accounted for 1.5%, while births and deaths accounted for -0.9%.

Most of the population (as of 2000) speaks German (1,123 or 96.8%) as their first language, French is the second most common (11 or 0.9%) and Italian is the third (7 or 0.6%).

As of 2008, the population was 48.4% male and 51.6% female. The population was made up of 545 Swiss men (45.7% of the population) and 32 (2.7%) non-Swiss men. There were 599 Swiss women (50.2%) and 1 (0.1%) non-Swiss women. Of the population in the municipality, 555 or about 47.8% were born in Leuzigen and lived there in 2000. There were 268 or 23.1% who were born in the same canton, while 252 or 21.7% were born somewhere else in Switzerland, and 51 or 4.4% were born outside of Switzerland.

As of 2010, children and teenagers (0–19 years old) make up 19.9% of the population, while adults (20–64 years old) make up 60.7% and seniors (over 64 years old) make up 19.4%.

As of 2000, there were 490 people who were single and never married in the municipality. There were 537 married individuals, 106 widows or widowers and 27 individuals who are divorced.

As of 2000, there were 126 households that consist of only one person and 39 households with five or more people. In 2000, a total of 452 apartments (91.7% of the total) were permanently occupied, while 22 apartments (4.5%) were seasonally occupied and 19 apartments (3.9%) were empty. As of 2010, the construction rate of new housing units was 2.5 new units per 1000 residents. The vacancy rate for the municipality, in 2011, was 0.71%.

The historical population is given in the following chart:

== Sights ==
The entire village of Leuzigen is designated as part of the Inventory of Swiss Heritage Sites.

== Politics ==
In the 2011 federal election the most popular party was the SVP which received 30.2% of the vote. The next three most popular parties were the BDP Party (26.4%), the SPS (13.8%) and the FDP (12.7%). In the federal election, a total of 407 votes were cast, and the voter turnout was 43.3%.

== Economy ==
In the Middle Ages, the population of Leuzigen mainly lived on agricultural produce and the sale of tuff stone and chalk. The excavation of tuff stone lost importance when it was gradually supplanted by brick stone. On the other hand, agriculture has remained important for Leuzigen until today. There are still a sizable number of farms in the village. Apart from small local businesses, such as workpiece suppliers for appliances, there are no large industries located in Leuzigen. About 75 percent of the people work outside of the village, as it is relatively close to cities such as Grenchen, Solothurn and Biel/Bienne. In addition, a junction of the motorway A5 is in close proximity and allows one to reach the capital Bern in half an hour by car.

As of 2011, Leuzigen had an unemployment rate of 1.53%. As of 2008, there were a total of 263 people employed in the municipality. Of these, there were 115 people employed in the primary economic sector and about 31 businesses involved in this sector. 62 people were employed in the secondary sector and there were 14 businesses in this sector. 86 people were employed in the tertiary sector, with 28 businesses in this sector.

In 2008 there were a total of 191 full-time equivalent jobs. The number of jobs in the primary sector was 80, of which 62 were in agriculture and 19 were in forestry or lumber production. The number of jobs in the secondary sector was 50 of which 39 or (78.0%) were in manufacturing and 11 (22.0%) were in construction. The number of jobs in the tertiary sector was 61. In the tertiary sector; 22 or 36.1% were in wholesale or retail sales or the repair of motor vehicles, 8 or 13.1% were in a hotel or restaurant, 6 or 9.8% were technical professionals or scientists, 9 or 14.8% were in education and 4 or 6.6% were in health care.

In 2000, there were 71 workers who commuted into the municipality and 430 workers who commuted away. The municipality is a net exporter of workers, with about 6.1 workers leaving the municipality for every one entering. Of the working population, 11.1% used public transportation to get to work, and 62.3% used a private car.

== Religion ==
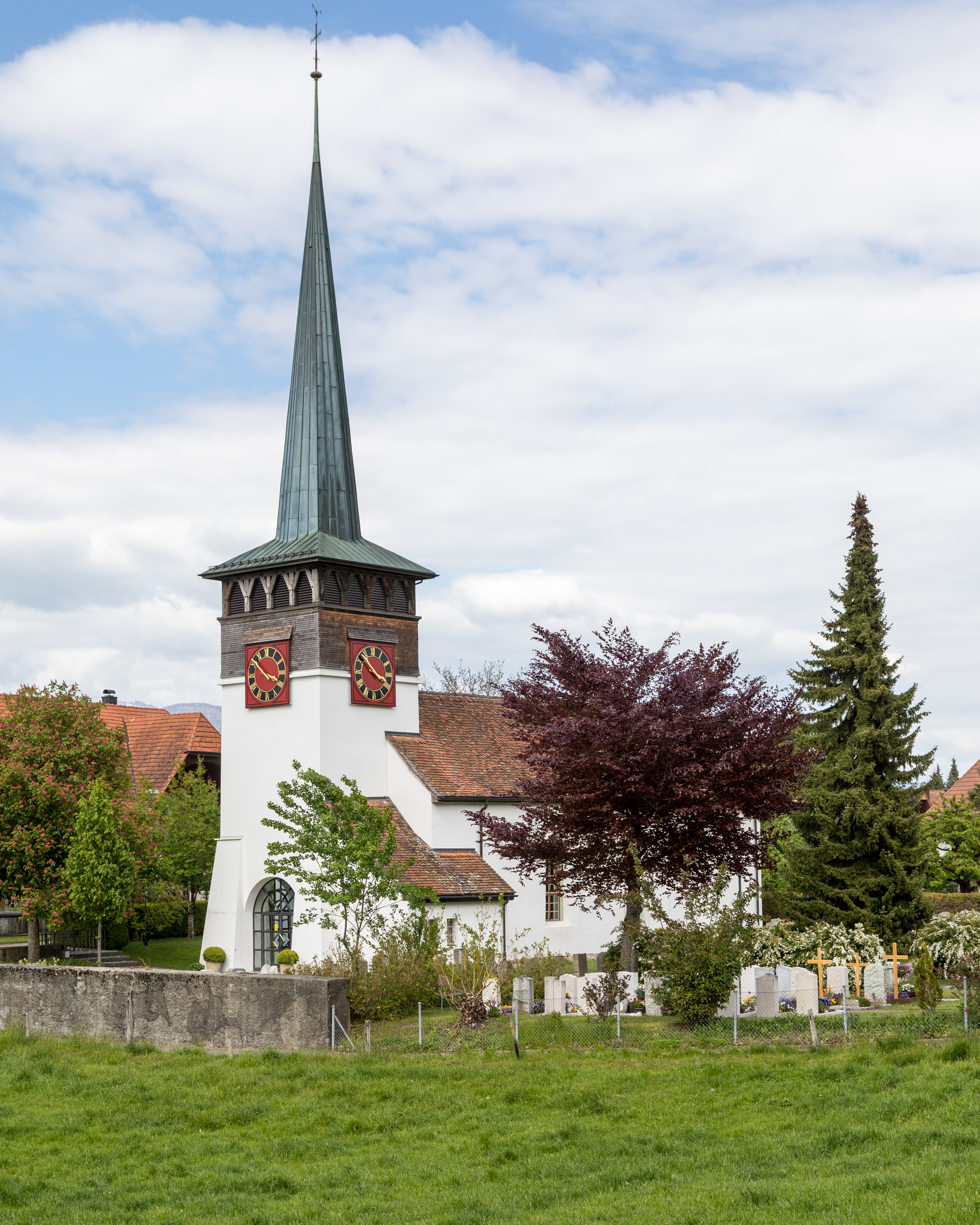
Reformed church

From the 2000 census, 139 or 12.0% were Roman Catholic, while 871 or 75.1% belonged to the Swiss Reformed Church. Of the rest of the population, there were 3 members of an Orthodox church (or about 0.26% of the population), there were 8 individuals (or about 0.69% of the population) who belonged to the Christian Catholic Church, and there were 38 individuals (or about 3.28% of the population) who belonged to another Christian church. There was 1 individual who was Jewish, and 5 (or about 0.43% of the population) who were Islamic. There were 5 individuals who were Hindu and 1 individual who belonged to another church. 72 (or about 6.21% of the population) belonged to no church, are agnostic or atheist, and 36 individuals (or about 3.10% of the population) did not answer the question.

== Education ==
In Leuzigen about 493 or (42.5%) of the population have completed non-mandatory upper secondary education, and 101 or (8.7%) have completed additional higher education (either university or a Fachhochschule). Of the 101 who completed tertiary schooling, 75.2% were Swiss men, 21.8% were Swiss women.

The Canton of Bern school system provides one year of non-obligatory Kindergarten, followed by six years of Primary school. This is followed by three years of obligatory lower Secondary school where the students are separated according to ability and aptitude. Following the lower Secondary students may attend additional schooling or they may enter an apprenticeship.

During the 2009-10 school year, there were a total of 93 students attending classes in Leuzigen. There was one kindergarten class with a total of 25 students in the municipality. The municipality had 4 primary classes and 68 students. Of the primary students, 4.4% were permanent or temporary residents of Switzerland (not citizens) and 2.9% have a different mother language than the classroom language.

As of 2000, there were 23 students in Leuzigen who came from another municipality, while 75 residents attended schools outside the municipality.
