= Brügglen =

- Former municipality
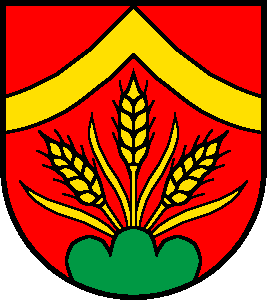
- Coat of arms
- Location of Brügglen
- Location within Switzerland Location within Canton of Solothurn
- Coordinates: 47°9′N 7°30′E
- Country: Switzerland
- Canton: Solothurn
- District: Bucheggberg

Area
  - Total: 1.72 km^{2} (0.66 sq mi)
- Elevation: 547 m (1,795 ft)

Population (Dec 2011)
  - Total: 201
  - Density: 117/km^{2} (303/sq mi)
- Time zone: UTC+01:00 (CET)
  - Summer (DST): UTC+02:00 (CEST)
- Postal code: 4582
- SFOS number: 2446
- ISO 3166 code: CH-SO
- Surrounded by: Aetingen, Küttigkofen, Kyburg-Buchegg, Lüterkofen-Ichertswil, Mühledorf, Tscheppach
- Website: www.buchegg-so.ch

Brügglen is a former municipality in the district of Bucheggberg, in the canton of Solothurn, Switzerland. On 1 January 2014 the former municipalities of Brügglen, Tscheppach, Aetingen, Aetigkofen, Bibern (SO), Gossliwil, Hessigkofen, Mühledorf (SO), Küttigkofen, Kyburg-Buchegg merged into the new municipality of Buchegg.

== History ==
Brügglen is first mentioned in 1249 as Bruglon.

== Geography ==
Before the merger, Brügglen had a total area of 1.7 km^{2} (0.66 mi^{2}). Of this area, 0.94 km^{2} (0.36 sq mi) or 54.7% is used for agricultural purposes, while 0.65 km^{2} (0.25 sq mi) or 37.8% is forested. Of the rest of the land, 0.1 km^{2} (25 acres) or 5.8% is settled (buildings or roads), 0.01 km^{2} (2.5 acres) or 0.6% is either rivers or lakes.

Of the built up area, housing and buildings made up 4.1% and transportation infrastructure made up 1.7%. Out of the forested land, 35.5% of the total land area is heavily forested and 2.3% is covered with orchards or small clusters of trees. Of the agricultural land, 28.5% is used for growing crops and 25.0% is pastures, while 1.2% is used for orchards or vine crops. All the water in the municipality is flowing water.

The former municipality is located in the Bucheggberg district, on a small plateau in the Mittelbucheggberg. It consists of the haufendorf village (an irregular, unplanned and quite closely packed village, built around a central square) of Brügglen.

== Coat of arms ==
The blazon of the municipal coat of arms is Gules three Ears Or with four leaves of the same issuant from a Mount of 3 Coupeaux Vert and in Chief a Chevron embowed of the second.

== Demographics ==
Brügglen had a population (as of 2011) of 201. As of 2008, 2.0% of the population are resident foreign nationals. Over the last 10 years (1999–2009 ) the population has changed at a rate of 11.5%.

Most of the population (as of 2000) speaks German (185 or 98.9%), with Italian being second most common (1 or 0.5%) and Turkish being third (1 or 0.5%).

As of 2008, the gender distribution of the population was 49.5% male and 50.5% female. The population was made up of 100 Swiss men (48.5% of the population) and 2 (1.0%) non-Swiss men. There were 101 Swiss women (49.0%) and 3 (1.5%) non-Swiss women. Of the population in the municipality 56 or about 29.9% were born in Brügglen and lived there in 2000. There were 56 or 29.9% who were born in the same canton, while 64 or 34.2% were born somewhere else in Switzerland, and 9 or 4.8% were born outside of Switzerland.

In 2008 there was 1 live birth to Swiss citizens and 1 death of a Swiss citizen. Ignoring immigration and emigration, the population of Swiss citizens and foreign residents remained the same. The total Swiss population change in 2008 (from all sources, including moves across municipal borders) was a decrease of 6 and the non-Swiss population increased by 2 people. This represents a population growth rate of -2.0%.

The age distribution, as of 2000, in Brügglen is; 14 children or 7.5% of the population are between 0 and 6 years old and 32 teenagers or 17.1% are between 7 and 19. Of the adult population, 4 people or 2.1% of the population are between 20 and 24 years old. 51 people or 27.3% are between 25 and 44, and 60 people or 32.1% are between 45 and 64. The senior population distribution is 17 people or 9.1% of the population are between 65 and 79 years old and there are 9 people or 4.8% who are over 80.

As of 2000, there were 69 people who were single and never married in the municipality. There were 95 married individuals, 11 widows or widowers and 12 individuals who are divorced.

In 2000 there were 51 single family homes (or 70.8% of the total) out of a total of 72 inhabited buildings. There were 3 multi-family buildings (4.2%), along with 15 multi-purpose buildings that were mostly used for housing (20.8%) and 3 other use buildings (commercial or industrial) that also had some housing (4.2%).

In 2000 there were 79 apartments in the municipality. Of these apartments, a total of 70 apartments (88.6% of the total) were permanently occupied, while 4 apartments (5.1%) were seasonally occupied and 5 apartments (6.3%) were empty. As of 2009, the construction rate of new housing units was 4.9 new units per 1000 residents. The vacancy rate for the municipality, in 2010, was 0%.

The historical population is given in the following chart:

== Politics ==
In the 2007 federal election the most popular party was the SP which received 29.74% of the vote. The next three most popular parties were the FDP (28.62%), the SVP (19.94%) and the Green Party (15.43%). In the federal election, a total of 89 votes were cast, and the voter turnout was 56.0%.

== Economy ==
As of 2010, Brügglen had an unemployment rate of 1%. As of 2008, there were 17 people employed in the primary economic sector and about 5 businesses involved in this sector. 7 people were employed in the secondary sector and there were 2 businesses in this sector. 1 person was employed in the tertiary sector, with 1 business in this sector. There were 102 residents of the municipality who were employed in some capacity, of which females made up 43.1% of the workforce.

In 2008 the total number of full-time equivalent jobs was 18. The number of jobs in the primary sector was 10, all of which were in agriculture. The number of jobs in the secondary sector was 7, all of which were in construction. The number of jobs in the tertiary sector was 1. In the tertiary sector; 1 was in the movement and storage of goods, .

In 2000, there were 4 workers who commuted into the municipality and 77 workers who commuted away. The municipality is a net exporter of workers, with about 19.3 workers leaving the municipality for every one entering. Of the working population, 3.9% used public transportation to get to work, and 69.6% used a private car.

== Religion ==
From the 2000 census, 18 or 9.6% were Roman Catholic, while 141 or 75.4% belonged to the Swiss Reformed Church. 25 (or about 13.37% of the population) belonged to no church, are agnostic or atheist, and 3 individuals (or about 1.60% of the population) did not answer the question.

== Education ==
In Brügglen about 68 or (36.4%) of the population have completed non-mandatory upper secondary education, and 24 or (12.8%) have completed additional higher education (either university or a Fachhochschule). Of the 24 who completed tertiary schooling, 79.2% were Swiss men, 20.8% were Swiss women.

As of 2000, there were 30 students from Brügglen who attended schools outside the municipality.
