= Aetingen =

- Former municipality
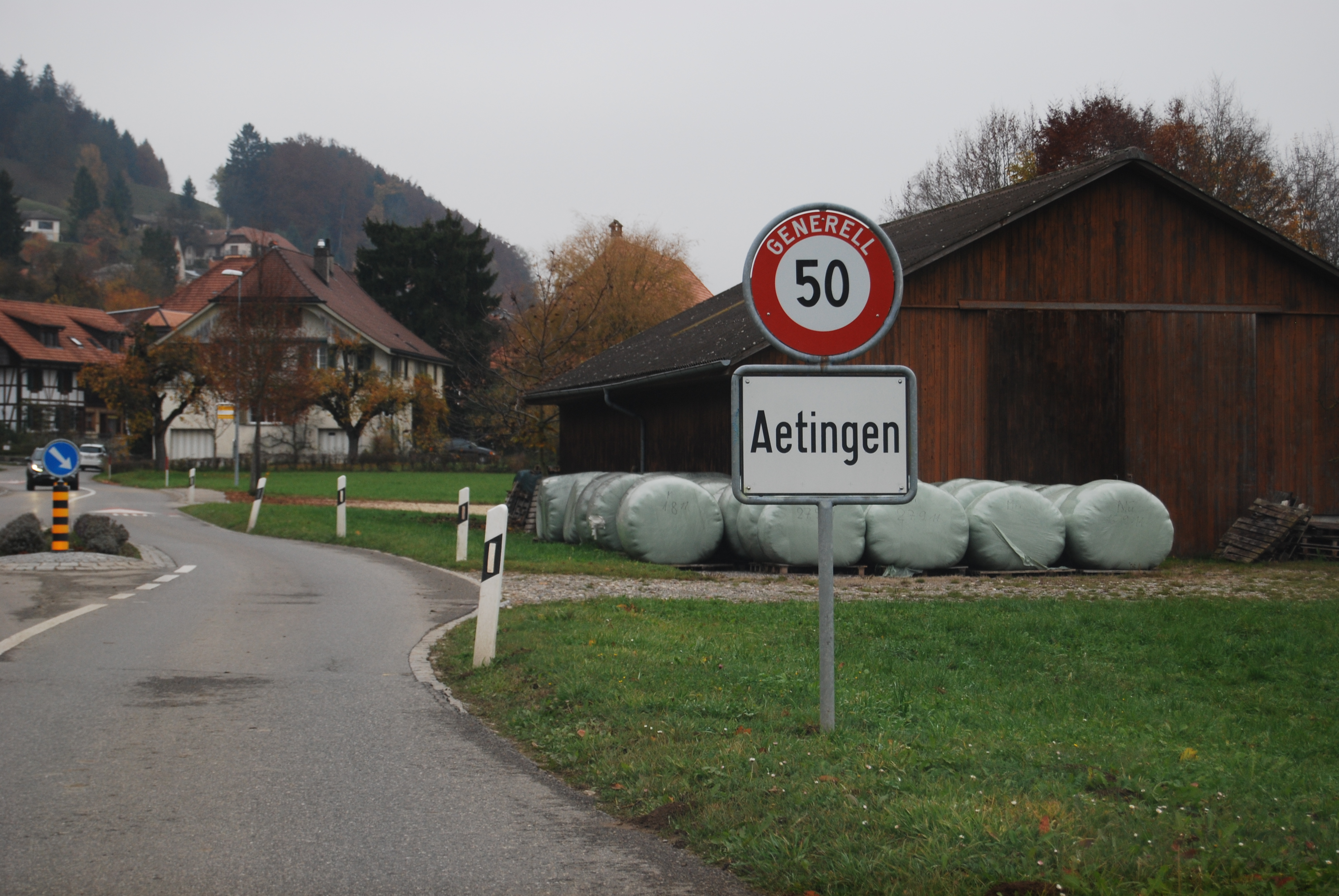

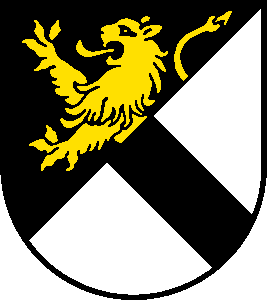
- Coat of arms
- Location of Aetingen
- Location within Switzerland Location within Canton of Solothurn
- Coordinates: 47°8′N 7°30′E
- Country: Switzerland
- Canton: Solothurn
- District: Bucheggberg

Area
  - Total: 2.83 km^{2} (1.09 sq mi)
- Elevation: 480 m (1,570 ft)

Population (Dec 2011)
  - Total: 300
  - Density: 110/km^{2} (270/sq mi)
- Time zone: UTC+01:00 (CET)
  - Summer (DST): UTC+02:00 (CEST)
- Postal code: 4587
- SFOS number: 2442
- ISO 3166 code: CH-SO
- Surrounded by: Bätterkinden (BE), Brügglen, Kyburg-Buchegg, Limpach (BE), Mühledorf, Unterramsern
- Website: www.buchegg-so.ch

Aetingen is a former municipality in the district of Bucheggberg in the canton of Solothurn in Switzerland. On 1 January 2014 the former municipalities of Aetingen, Tscheppach, Brügglen, Aetigkofen, Bibern (SO), Gossliwil, Hessigkofen, Mühledorf (SO), Küttigkofen, Kyburg-Buchegg merged into the new municipality of Buchegg.

== History ==
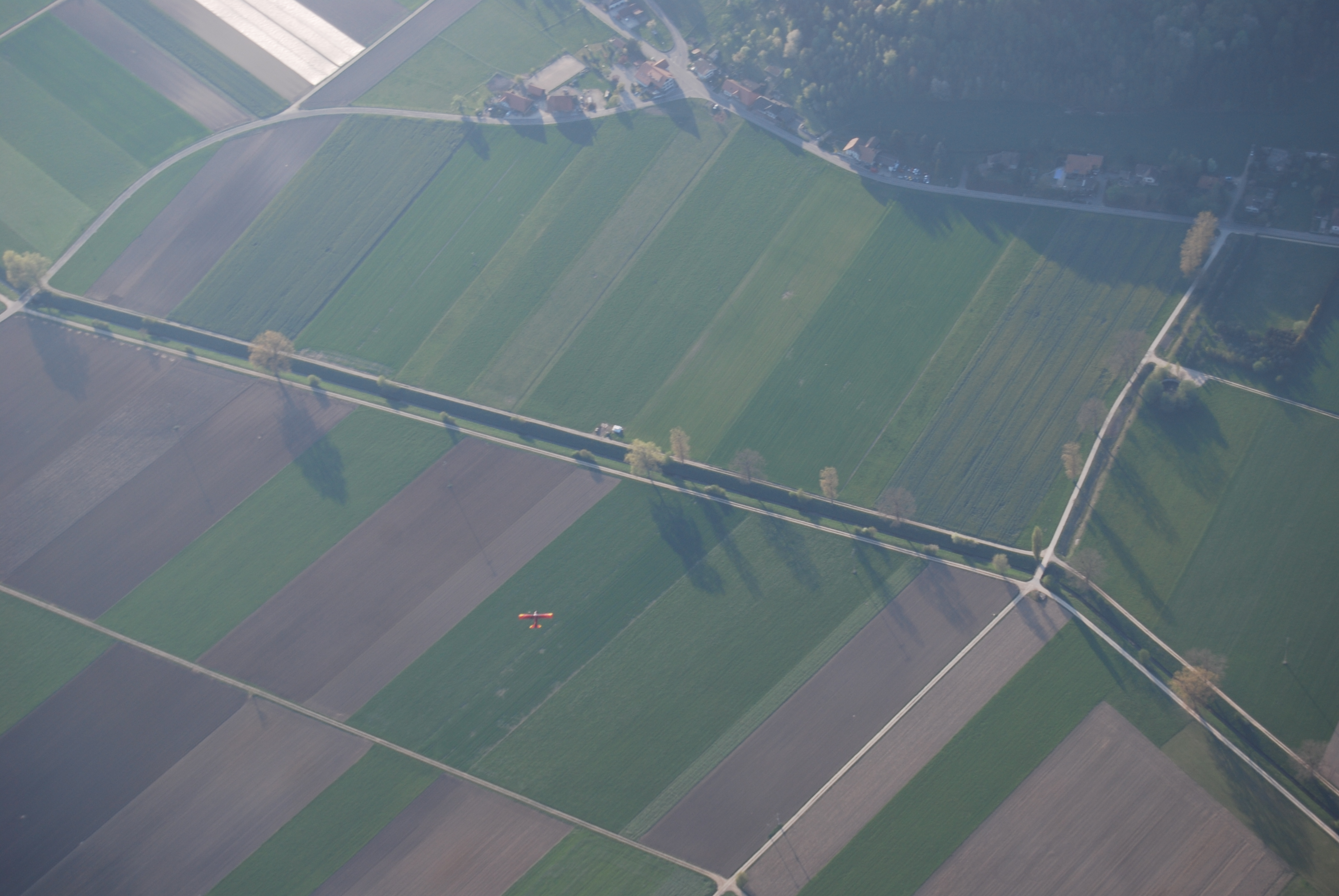
Brittern (Aetingen)

Aetingen is first mentioned in 1267 as Etinge.

== Geography ==
Before the merger, Aetingen had a total area of 2.9 km^{2} (1.1 mi^{2}). Of this area, 1.2 km^{2} (0.46 sq mi) or 42.4% is used for agricultural purposes, while 1.21 km^{2} (0.47 sq mi) or 42.8% is forested. Of the rest of the land, 0.4 km^{2} (0.15 sq mi) or 14.1% is settled (buildings or roads), 0.04 km^{2} (9.9 acres) or 1.4% is either rivers or lakes.

Of the built up area, housing and buildings made up 3.9% and transportation infrastructure made up 2.8%. while parks, green belts and sports fields made up 7.4%. Out of the forested land, all of the forested land area is covered with heavy forests. Of the agricultural land, 28.6% is used for growing crops and 13.1% is pastures. All the water in the municipality is flowing water.

The former municipality is located in the Bucheggberg district, in the Limpach valley along the southern flank of the Bucheggberg. It consists of the haufendorf village (an irregular, unplanned and quite closely packed village, built around a central square) of Aetingen and the settlement of Brittern.

== Coat of arms ==
The blazon of the municipal coat of arms is Per bend sinister Sable a Semi Lion issuant rampant Or and Argent a Bend of the first.

== Demographics ==
Aetingen had a population (as of 2011) of 300. As of 2008, 3.9% of the population are resident foreign nationals. Over the last 10 years (1997–2007) the population has changed at a rate of 11.8%. Most of the population (as of 2000) speaks German (263 or 96.3%), with French being second most common (7 or 2.6%) and English being third (2 or 0.7%).

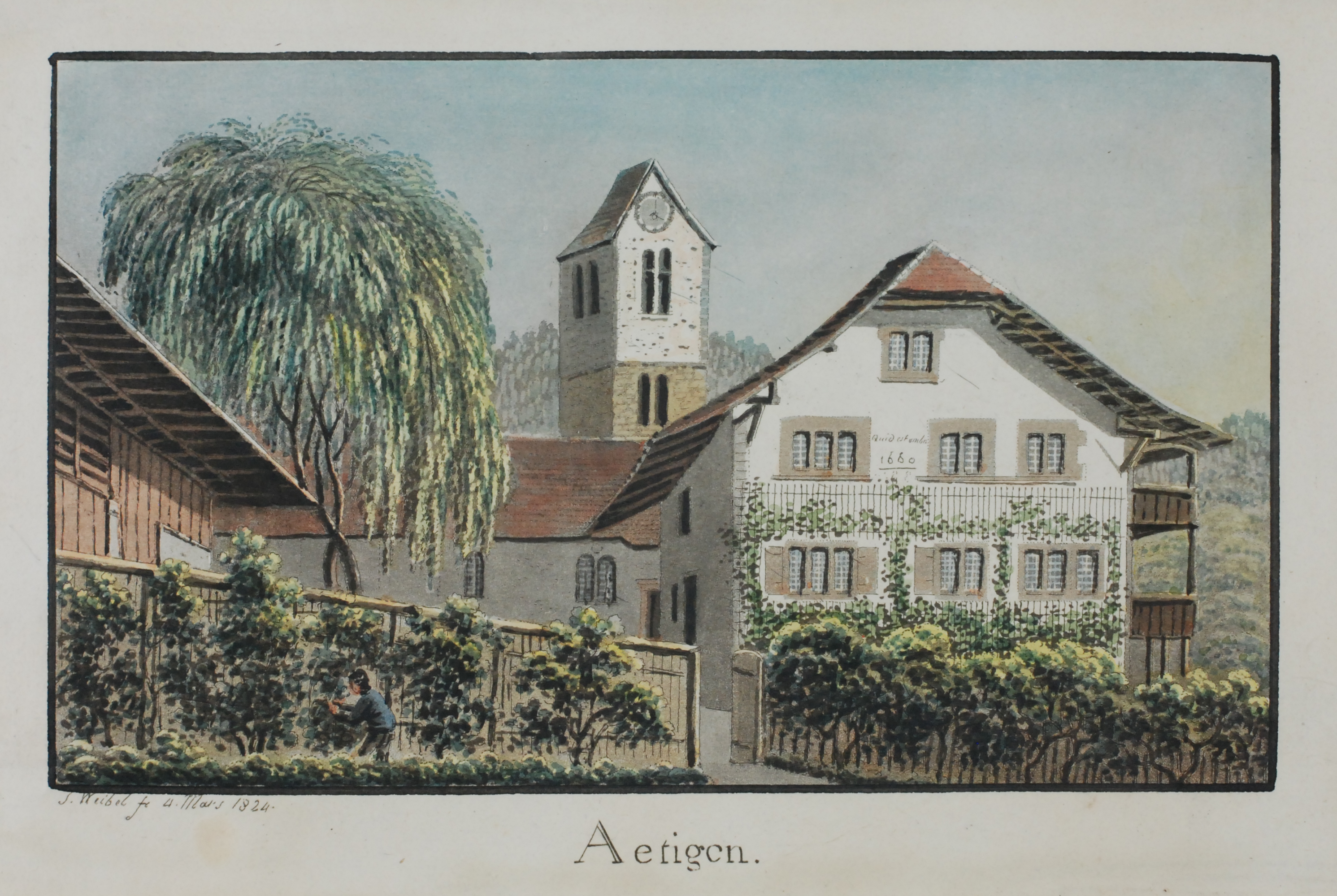
View of the Reformed Church rectory and parish barn, 1824.

As of 2008, the gender distribution of the population was 48.0% male and 52.0% female. The population was made up of 137 Swiss men (44.8% of the population) and 10 (3.3%) non-Swiss men. There were 153 Swiss women (50.0%) and 6 (2.0%) non-Swiss women. Of the population in the municipality 99 or about 36.3% were born in Aetingen and lived there in 2000. There were 51 or 18.7% who were born in the same canton, while 100 or 36.6% were born somewhere else in Switzerland, and 14 or 5.1% were born outside of Switzerland.

In 2008 there were 4 live births to Swiss citizens and 1 death of a Swiss citizen. Ignoring immigration and emigration, the population of Swiss citizens increased by 3 while the foreign population remained the same. There . At the same time, there . The total Swiss population change in 2008 (from all sources, including moves across municipal borders) was a decrease of 2 and the non-Swiss population increased by 1 people. This represents a population growth rate of -0.3%.

The age distribution, as of 2000, in Aetingen is; 20 children or 7.3% of the population are between 0 and 6 years old and 51 teenagers or 18.7% are between 7 and 19. Of the adult population, 6 people or 2.2% of the population are between 20 and 24 years old. 93 people or 34.1% are between 25 and 44, and 49 people or 17.9% are between 45 and 64. The senior population distribution is 44 people or 16.1% of the population are between 65 and 79 years old and there are 10 people or 3.7% who are over 80.

As of 2000, there were 110 people who were single and never married in the municipality. There were 133 married individuals, 18 widows or widowers and 12 individuals who are divorced.

In 2000 there were 48 single family homes (or 53.9% of the total) out of a total of 89 inhabited buildings. There were 13 multi-family buildings (14.6%), along with 22 multi-purpose buildings that were mostly used for housing (24.7%) and 6 other use buildings (commercial or industrial) that also had some housing (6.7%).

In 2000 there were 114 apartments in the municipality. Of these apartments, a total of 106 apartments (93.0% of the total) were permanently occupied, while 4 apartments (3.5%) were seasonally occupied and 4 apartments (3.5%) were empty. As of 2009, the construction rate of new housing units was 3.3 new units per 1000 residents. The vacancy rate for the municipality, in 2010, was 0%.

The historical population is given in the following chart:

== Politics ==
In the 2007 federal election the most popular party was the FDP which received 39.64% of the vote. The next three most popular parties were the SVP (24.88%), the Green Party (12.27%) and the SP (10.95%). In the federal election, a total of 89 votes were cast, and the voter turnout was 39.0%.

== Economy ==
As of 2010, Aetingen had an unemployment rate of 0.7%. As of 2008, there were 16 people employed in the primary economic sector and about 8 businesses involved in this sector. 11 people were employed in the secondary sector and there were 3 businesses in this sector. 48 people were employed in the tertiary sector, with 11 businesses in this sector. There were 135 residents of the municipality who were employed in some capacity, of which females made up 40.0% of the workforce.

In 2008 the total number of full-time equivalent jobs was 59. The number of jobs in the primary sector was 11, of which 9 were in agriculture and 2 were in forestry or lumber production. The number of jobs in the secondary sector was 10, all of which were in manufacturing. The number of jobs in the tertiary sector was 38. In the tertiary sector; 3 or 7.9% were in wholesale or retail sales or the repair of motor vehicles, 10 or 26.3% were in a hotel or restaurant, 4 or 10.5% were technical professionals or scientists, 3 or 7.9% were in education.

In 2000, there were 28 workers who commuted into the municipality and 94 workers who commuted away. The municipality is a net exporter of workers, with about 3.4 workers leaving the municipality for every one entering. Of the working population, 11.1% used public transportation to get to work, and 59.3% used a private car.

== Religion ==
From the 2000 census, 21 or 7.7% were Roman Catholic, while 212 or 77.7% belonged to the Swiss Reformed Church. Of the rest of the population, there were 5 individuals (or about 1.83% of the population) who belonged to the Christian Catholic Church, and there were 3 individuals (or about 1.10% of the population) who belonged to another Christian church. 28 (or about 10.26% of the population) belonged to no church, are agnostic or atheist, and 4 individuals (or about 1.47% of the population) did not answer the question.

== Education ==
In Aetingen about 110 or (40.3%) of the population have completed non-mandatory upper secondary education, and 41 or (15.0%) have completed additional higher education (either university or a Fachhochschule). Of the 41 who completed tertiary schooling, 75.6% were Swiss men, 24.4% were Swiss women.

As of 2000, there were 11 students in Aetingen who came from another municipality, while 39 residents attended schools outside the municipality.
