= Küttigkofen =

- Former municipality
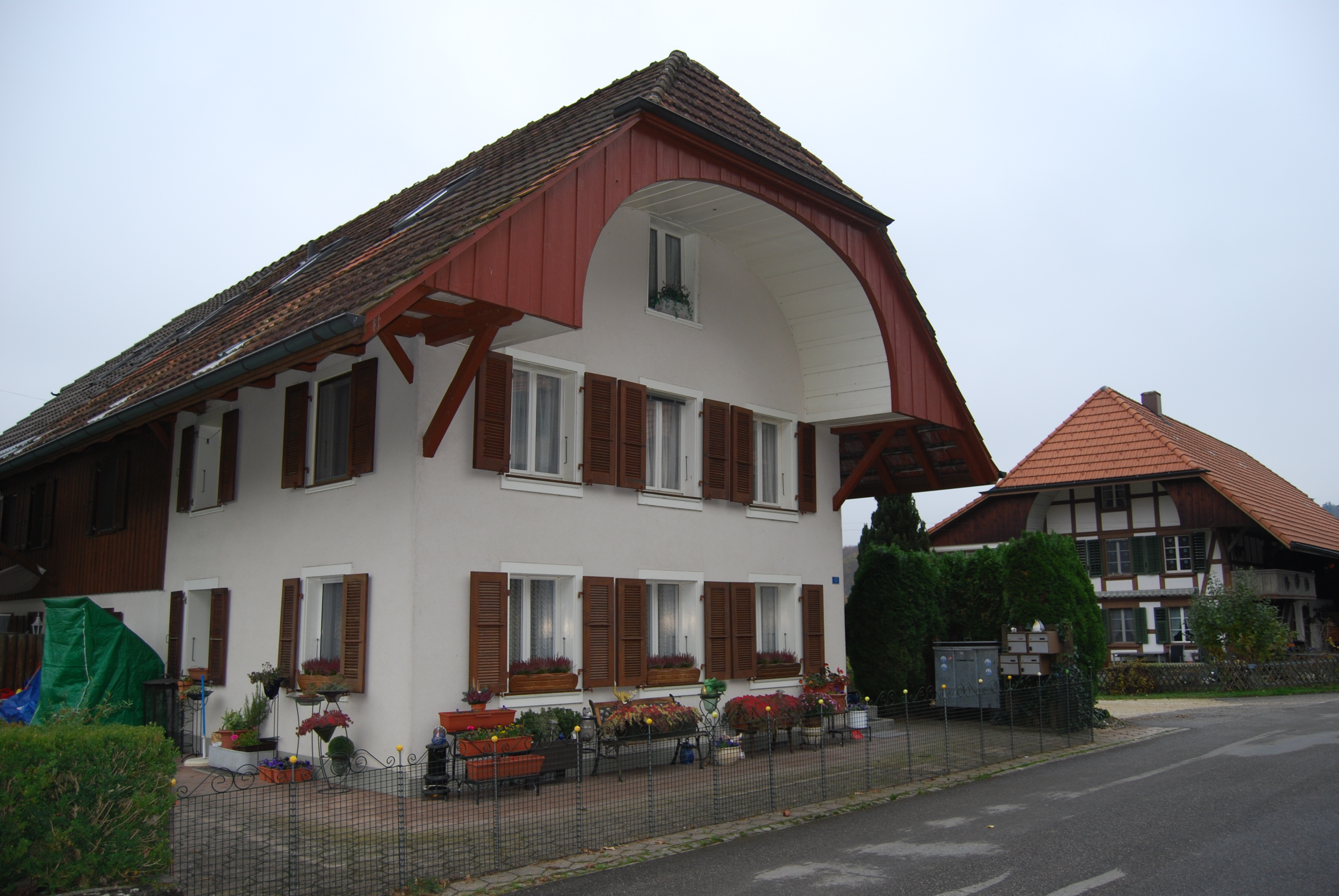

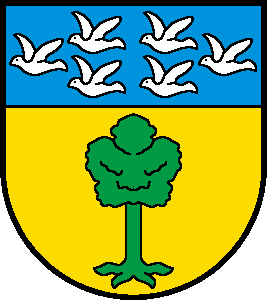
- Coat of arms
- Location of Küttigkofen
- Location within Switzerland Location within Canton of Solothurn
- Coordinates: 47°9′N 7°31′E
- Country: Switzerland
- Canton: Solothurn
- District: Bucheggberg

Area
  - Total: 2.13 km^{2} (0.82 sq mi)
- Elevation: 481 m (1,578 ft)

Population (Dec 2011)
  - Total: 262
  - Density: 123/km^{2} (319/sq mi)
- Time zone: UTC+01:00 (CET)
  - Summer (DST): UTC+02:00 (CEST)
- Postal code: 4581
- SFOS number: 2452
- ISO 3166 code: CH-SO
- Surrounded by: Bätterkinden (BE), Brügglen, Kyburg-Buchegg, Lüterkofen-Ichertswil
- Website: www.buchegg-so.ch

Küttigkofen is a former municipality in the district of Bucheggberg, in the canton of Solothurn, Switzerland. On 1 January 2014 the former municipalities of Küttigkofen, Tscheppach, Brügglen, Aetingen, Aetigkofen, Bibern (SO), Gossliwil, Hessigkofen, Mühledorf (SO), Kyburg-Buchegg merged into the new municipality of Buchegg.

== History ==
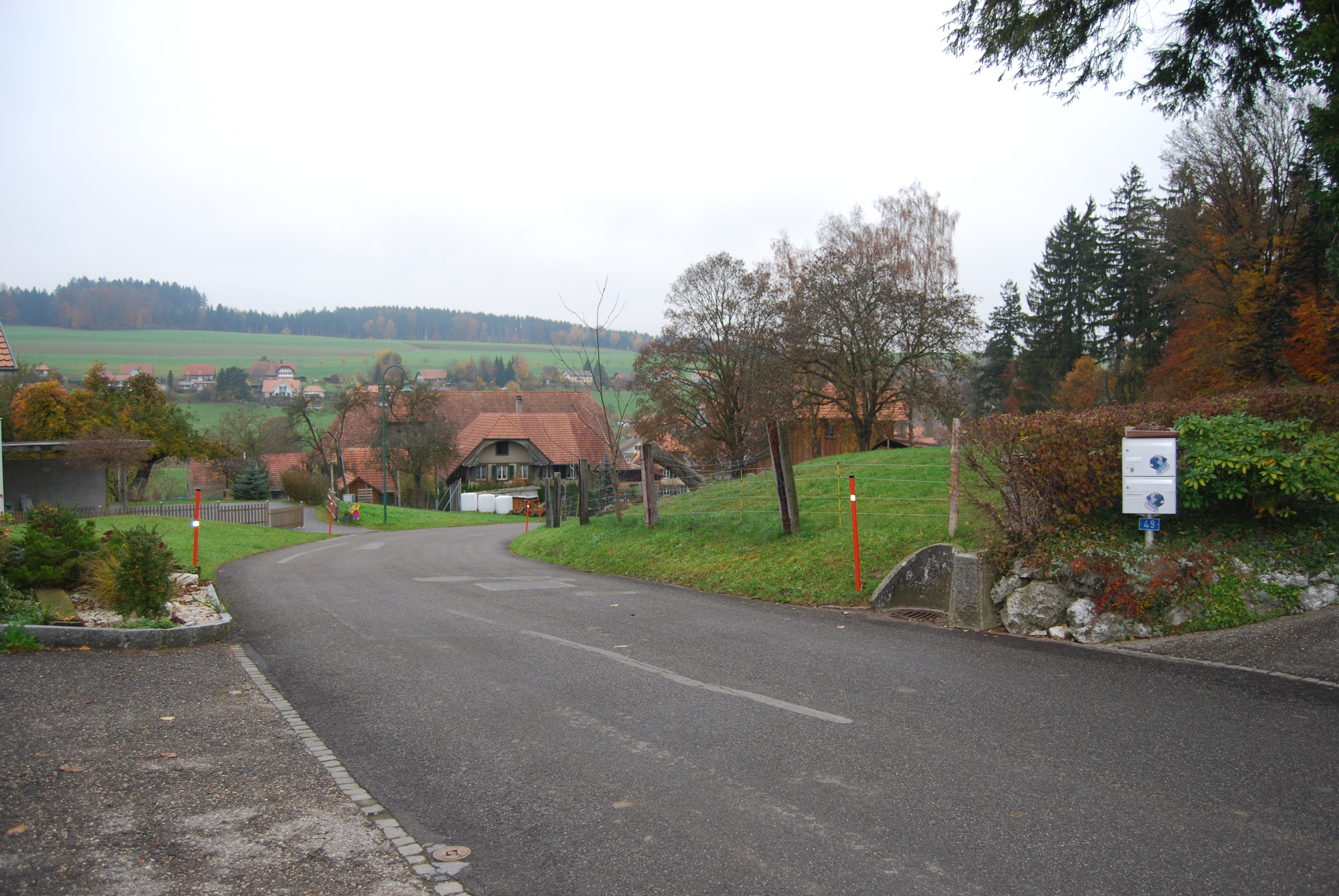
Küttigkofen

Küttigkofen is first mentioned in 1316 as obrenchúttenkouen.

== Geography ==
Before the merger, Küttigkofen had a total area of 2.2 km^{2} (0.85 mi^{2}). Of this area, 1.3 km^{2} (0.50 sq mi) or 61.0% is used for agricultural purposes, while 0.67 km^{2} (0.26 sq mi) or 31.5% is forested. Of the rest of the land, 0.18 km^{2} (0.069 sq mi) or 8.5% is settled (buildings or roads), 0.01 km^{2} (2.5 acres) or 0.5% is either rivers or lakes.

Of the built up area, housing and buildings made up 3.8% and transportation infrastructure made up 4.2%. Out of the forested land, all of the forested land area is covered with heavy forests. Of the agricultural land, 36.6% is used for growing crops and 22.1% is pastures, while 2.3% is used for orchards or vine crops. All the water in the municipality is flowing water.

The former municipality is located in the Bucheggberg district, at the end of the Müli valley. It consists of the village of Küttigkofen and scattered settlements.

== Coat of arms ==
The blazon of the municipal coat of arms is Or a Beech Tree eradicated Vert and in a Chief Azure six Doves Argent volant to Dexter.

== Demographics ==
Küttigkofen had a population (as of 2011) of 262. As of 2008, 4.5% of the population are resident foreign nationals. Over the last 10 years (1999–2009 ) the population has changed at a rate of 2%.

Most of the population (as of 2000) speaks German (237 or 98.8%), with French and English each being spoken by 1 person.

As of 2008, the gender distribution of the population was 48.2% male and 51.8% female. The population was made up of 117 Swiss men (47.0% of the population) and 3 (1.2%) non-Swiss men. There were 124 Swiss women (49.8%) and 5 (2.0%) non-Swiss women. Of the population in the municipality 85 or about 35.4% were born in Küttigkofen and lived there in 2000. There were 69 or 28.8% who were born in the same canton, while 70 or 29.2% were born somewhere else in Switzerland, and 15 or 6.3% were born outside of Switzerland.

In 2008 there was 1 live birth to Swiss citizens and were 4 deaths of Swiss citizens. Ignoring immigration and emigration, the population of Swiss citizens decreased by 3 while the foreign population remained the same. There was 1 Swiss woman who immigrated back to Switzerland. At the same time, there was 1 non-Swiss woman who immigrated from another country to Switzerland. The total Swiss population change in 2008 (from all sources, including moves across municipal borders) was a decrease of 3 and the non-Swiss population increased by 2 people. This represents a population growth rate of -0.4%.

The age distribution, as of 2000, in Küttigkofen is; 19 children or 7.9% of the population are between 0 and 6 years old and 43 teenagers or 17.9% are between 7 and 19. Of the adult population, 18 people or 7.5% of the population are between 20 and 24 years old. 61 people or 25.4% are between 25 and 44, and 68 people or 28.3% are between 45 and 64. The senior population distribution is 24 people or 10.0% of the population are between 65 and 79 years old and there are 7 people or 2.9% who are over 80.

As of 2000, there were 102 people who were single and never married in the municipality. There were 114 married individuals, 10 widows or widowers and 14 individuals who are divorced.

In 2000 there were 49 single family homes (or 69.0% of the total) out of a total of 71 inhabited buildings. There were 6 multi-family buildings (8.5%), along with 14 multi-purpose buildings that were mostly used for housing (19.7%) and 2 other use buildings (commercial or industrial) that also had some housing (2.8%).

In 2000 there were 86 apartments in the municipality. Of these apartments, a total of 84 apartments (97.7% of the total) were permanently occupied, while 2 apartments (2.3%) were seasonally occupied. As of 2009, the construction rate of new housing units was 0 new units per 1000 residents. The vacancy rate for the municipality, in 2010, was 0%.

The historical population is given in the following chart:

== Politics ==
In the 2007 federal election the most popular party was the FDP which received 35.55% of the vote. The next three most popular parties were the SVP (22.12%), the SP (18.8%) and the Green Party (10.61%). In the federal election, a total of 115 votes were cast, and the voter turnout was 54.5%.

== Economy ==
As of 2010, Küttigkofen had an unemployment rate of 0.8%. As of 2008, there were 22 people employed in the primary economic sector and about 9 businesses involved in this sector. 2 people were employed in the secondary sector and there was 1 business in this sector. 39 people were employed in the tertiary sector, with 6 businesses in this sector. There were 130 residents of the municipality who were employed in some capacity, of which females made up 42.3% of the workforce.

In 2008 the total number of full-time equivalent jobs was 46. The number of jobs in the primary sector was 11, all of which were in agriculture. The number of jobs in the secondary sector was 1, all of which were in construction. The number of jobs in the tertiary sector was 34. In the tertiary sector; 2 or 5.9% were in wholesale or retail sales or the repair of motor vehicles, 3 or 8.8% were in the movement and storage of goods, 4 or 11.8% were in a hotel or restaurant, 1 was a technical professional or scientist.

In 2000, there were 44 workers who commuted into the municipality and 97 workers who commuted away. The municipality is a net exporter of workers, with about 2.2 workers leaving the municipality for every one entering. Of the working population, 14.6% used public transportation to get to work, and 56.2% used a private car.

== Religion ==
From the 2000 census, 37 or 15.4% were Roman Catholic, while 165 or 68.8% belonged to the Swiss Reformed Church. Of the rest of the population, there was 1 member of an Orthodox church, and there were 3 individuals (or about 1.25% of the population) who belonged to another Christian church. There was 1 individual who was Islamic. 33 (or about 13.75% of the population) belonged to no church, are agnostic or atheist.

== Education ==
In Küttigkofen about 95 or (39.6%) of the population have completed non-mandatory upper secondary education, and 45 or (18.8%) have completed additional higher education (either university or a Fachhochschule). Of the 45 who completed tertiary schooling, 64.4% were Swiss men, 33.3% were Swiss women.

As of 2000, there were 15 students in Küttigkofen who came from another municipality, while 38 residents attended schools outside the municipality.
