= Hessigkofen =

- Former municipality
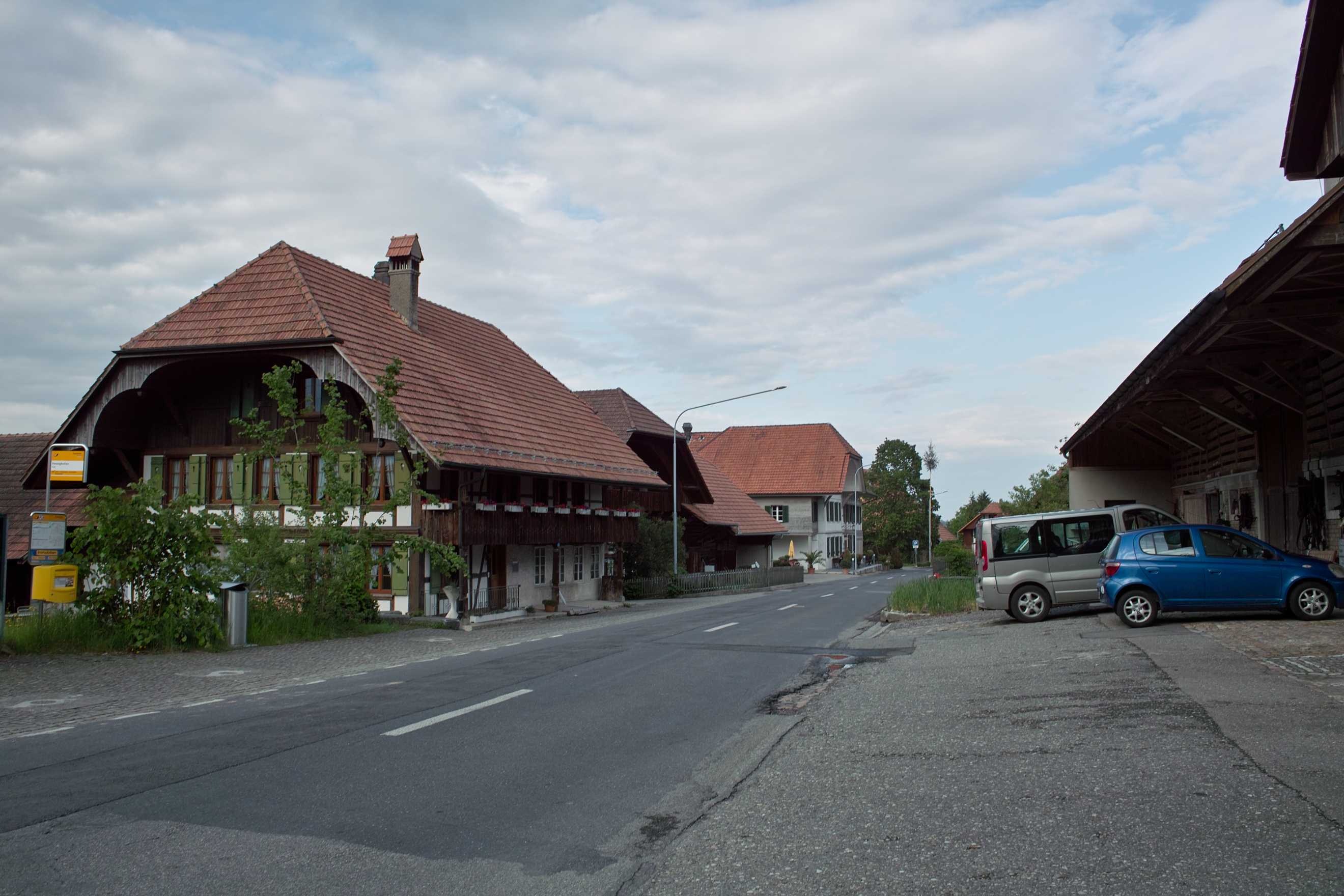

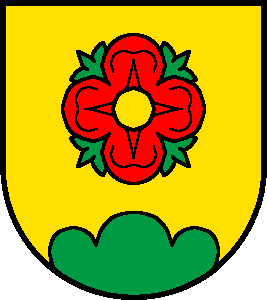
- Coat of arms
- Location of Hessigkofen
- Location within Switzerland Location within Canton of Solothurn
- Coordinates: 47°9′N 7°28′E
- Country: Switzerland
- Canton: Solothurn
- District: Bucheggberg

Area
  - Total: 2.26 km^{2} (0.87 sq mi)
- Elevation: 589 m (1,932 ft)

Population (Dec 2011)
  - Total: 261
  - Density: 115/km^{2} (299/sq mi)
- Time zone: UTC+01:00 (CET)
  - Summer (DST): UTC+02:00 (CEST)
- Postal code: 4577
- SFOS number: 2450
- ISO 3166 code: CH-SO
- Surrounded by: Bibern, Gossliwil, Lüterswil-Gächliwil, Mühledorf, Tscheppach
- Website: www.buchegg-so.ch

Hessigkofen is a former municipality in the district of Bucheggberg, in the canton of Solothurn, Switzerland. On 1 January 2014 the former municipalities of Hessigkofen, Tscheppach, Brügglen, Aetingen, Aetigkofen, Bibern (SO), Gossliwil, Mühledorf (SO), Küttigkofen, Kyburg-Buchegg merged into the new municipality of Buchegg.

== History ==
Hessigkofen is first mentioned in 1034 as Esikouen.

== Geography ==
Before the merger, Hessigkofen had a total area of 2.3 km^{2} (0.89 mi^{2}). Of this area, 1.35 km^{2} (0.52 sq mi) or 59.7% is used for agricultural purposes, while 0.74 km^{2} (0.29 sq mi) or 32.7% is forested. Of the rest of the land, 0.17 km^{2} (0.066 sq mi) or 7.5% is settled (buildings or roads).

Of the built up area, housing and buildings made up 4.4% and transportation infrastructure made up 2.2%. Out of the forested land, all of the forested land area is covered with heavy forests. Of the agricultural land, 36.7% is used for growing crops and 21.7% is pastures, while 1.3% is used for orchards or vine crops.

The former municipality is located in the Bucheggberg district, in the Müli valley.

== Coat of arms ==
The blazon of the municipal coat of arms is Or a Quatrefoil Rose Gules barbed and seeded proper over a Mount of 3 Coupeaux Vert.

== Demographics ==
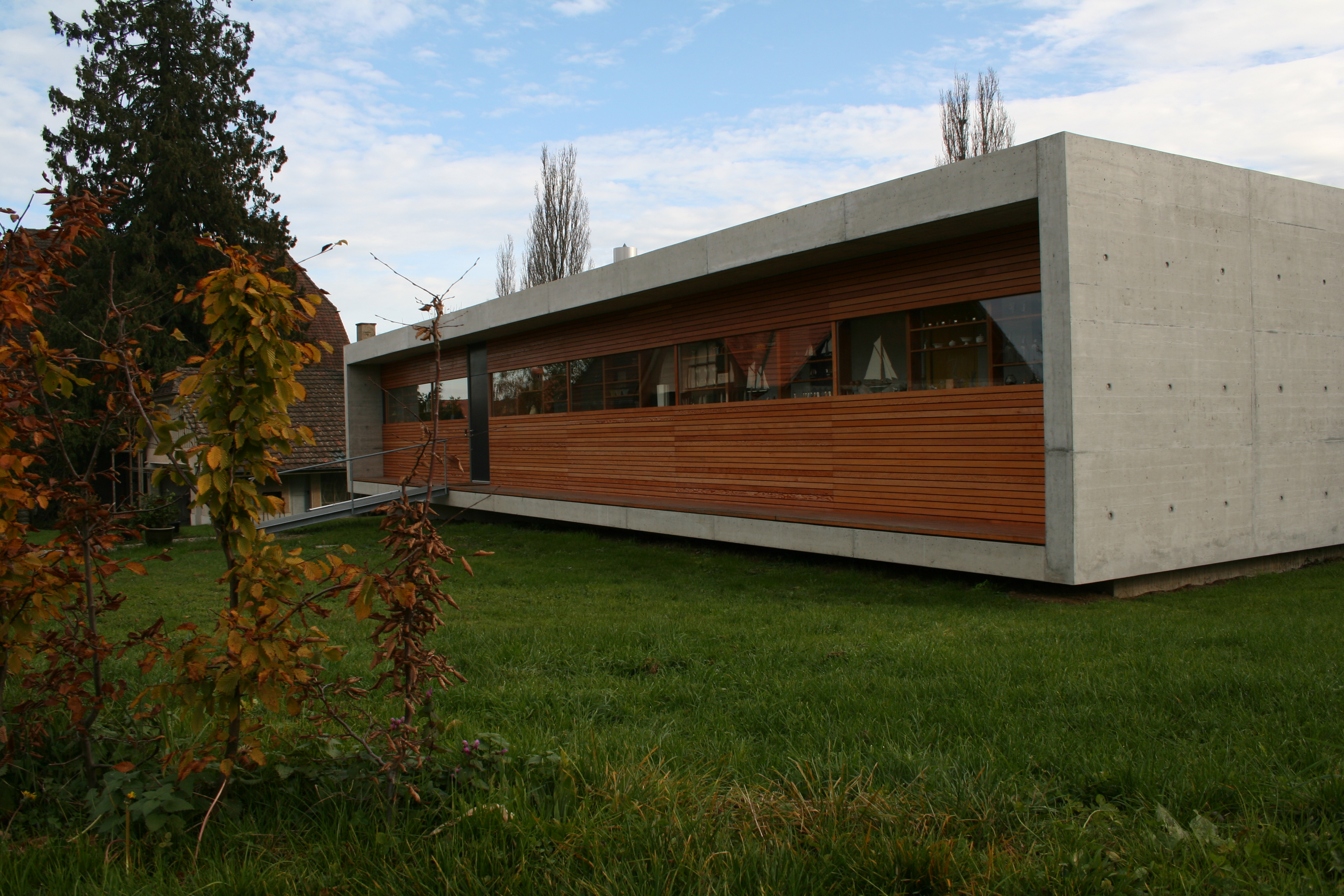
House in Hessigkofen

Hessigkofen had a population (as of 2011) of 261. As of 2008, 2.3% of the population are resident foreign nationals. Over the last 10 years (1999–2009 ) the population has changed at a rate of 6.9%.

Most of the population (as of 2000) speaks German (246 or 99.2%), with French and Swedish both being second most common (1 or 0.4% each).

As of 2008, the gender distribution of the population was 50.8% male and 49.2% female. The population was made up of 128 Swiss men (48.5% of the population) and 6 (2.3%) non-Swiss men. There were 127 Swiss women (48.1%) and 3 (1.1%) non-Swiss women. Of the population in the municipality 91 or about 36.7% were born in Hessigkofen and lived there in 2000. There were 71 or 28.6% who were born in the same canton, while 76 or 30.6% were born somewhere else in Switzerland, and 7 or 2.8% were born outside of Switzerland.

In 2008 there were 2 live births to Swiss citizens and were 5 deaths of Swiss citizens. Ignoring immigration and emigration, the population of Swiss citizens decreased by 3 while the foreign population remained the same. The total Swiss population remained the same in 2008 and the non-Swiss population increased by 1 person. This represents a population growth rate of 0.4%.

The age distribution, as of 2000, in Hessigkofen is; 32 children or 12.9% of the population are between 0 and 6 years old and 44 teenagers or 17.7% are between 7 and 19. Of the adult population, 14 people or 5.6% of the population are between 20 and 24 years old. 70 people or 28.2% are between 25 and 44, and 60 people or 24.2% are between 45 and 64. The senior population distribution is 17 people or 6.9% of the population are between 65 and 79 years old and there are 11 people or 4.4% who are over 80.

As of 2000, there were 101 people who were single and never married in the municipality. There were 131 married individuals, 7 widows or widowers and 9 individuals who are divorced.

In 2000 there were 42 single family homes (or 60.0% of the total) out of a total of 70 inhabited buildings. There were 6 multi-family buildings (8.6%), along with 19 multi-purpose buildings that were mostly used for housing (27.1%) and 3 other use buildings (commercial or industrial) that also had some housing (4.3%).

In 2000 there were 82 apartments in the municipality and all of the apartments were permanently occupied. As of 2009, the construction rate of new housing units was 11.5 new units per 1000 residents. The vacancy rate for the municipality, in 2010, was 1.08%.

The historical population is given in the following chart:

== Politics ==
In the 2007 federal election the most popular party was the FDP which received 29.12% of the vote. The next three most popular parties were the SP (27.92%), the SVP (18.32%) and the Green Party (15.92%). In the federal election, a total of 131 votes were cast, and the voter turnout was 66.2%.

== Economy ==
As of 2010, Hessigkofen had an unemployment rate of 0.6%. As of 2008, there were 22 people employed in the primary economic sector and about 7 businesses involved in this sector. 6 people were employed in the secondary sector and there were 4 businesses in this sector. 72 people were employed in the tertiary sector, with 12 businesses in this sector. There were 133 residents of the municipality who were employed in some capacity, of which females made up 45.1% of the workforce.

In 2008 the total number of full-time equivalent jobs was 73. The number of jobs in the primary sector was 15, all of which were in agriculture. The number of jobs in the secondary sector was 5, all of which were in manufacturing. The number of jobs in the tertiary sector was 53. In the tertiary sector; 35 or 66.0% were in wholesale or retail sales or the repair of motor vehicles, 5 or 9.4% were technical professionals or scientists, 6 or 11.3% were in education and 6 or 11.3% were in health care.

In 2000, there were 26 workers who commuted into the municipality and 90 workers who commuted away. The municipality is a net exporter of workers, with about 3.5 workers leaving the municipality for every one entering. Of the working population, 7.5% used public transportation to get to work, and 60.2% used a private car.

== Religion ==
From the 2000 census, 29 or 11.7% were Roman Catholic, while 174 or 70.2% belonged to the Swiss Reformed Church. Of the rest of the population, there were 4 individuals (or about 1.61% of the population) who belonged to the Christian Catholic Church, and there were 13 individuals (or about 5.24% of the population) who belonged to another Christian church. 28 (or about 11.29% of the population) belonged to no church, are agnostic or atheist.

== Weather ==
Hessigkofen has an average of 130.6 days of rain or snow per year and on average receives 1,112 mm (43.8 in) of precipitation. The wettest month is August during which time Hessigkofen receives an average of 124 mm (4.9 in) of rain or snow. During this month there is precipitation for an average of 11.2 days. The month with the most days of precipitation is May, with an average of 12.8, but with only 103 mm (4.1 in) of rain or snow. The driest month of the year is March with an average of 76 mm (3.0 in) of precipitation over 12.1 days.

== Education ==
In Hessigkofen about 102 or (41.1%) of the population have completed non-mandatory upper secondary education, and 45 or (18.1%) have completed additional higher education (either university or a Fachhochschule). Of the 45 who completed tertiary schooling, 71.1% were Swiss men, 28.9% were Swiss women.

As of 2000, there were 150 students in Hessigkofen who came from another municipality, while 37 residents attended schools outside the municipality.
