= Bibern, Solothurn =

Bibern
- Former municipality
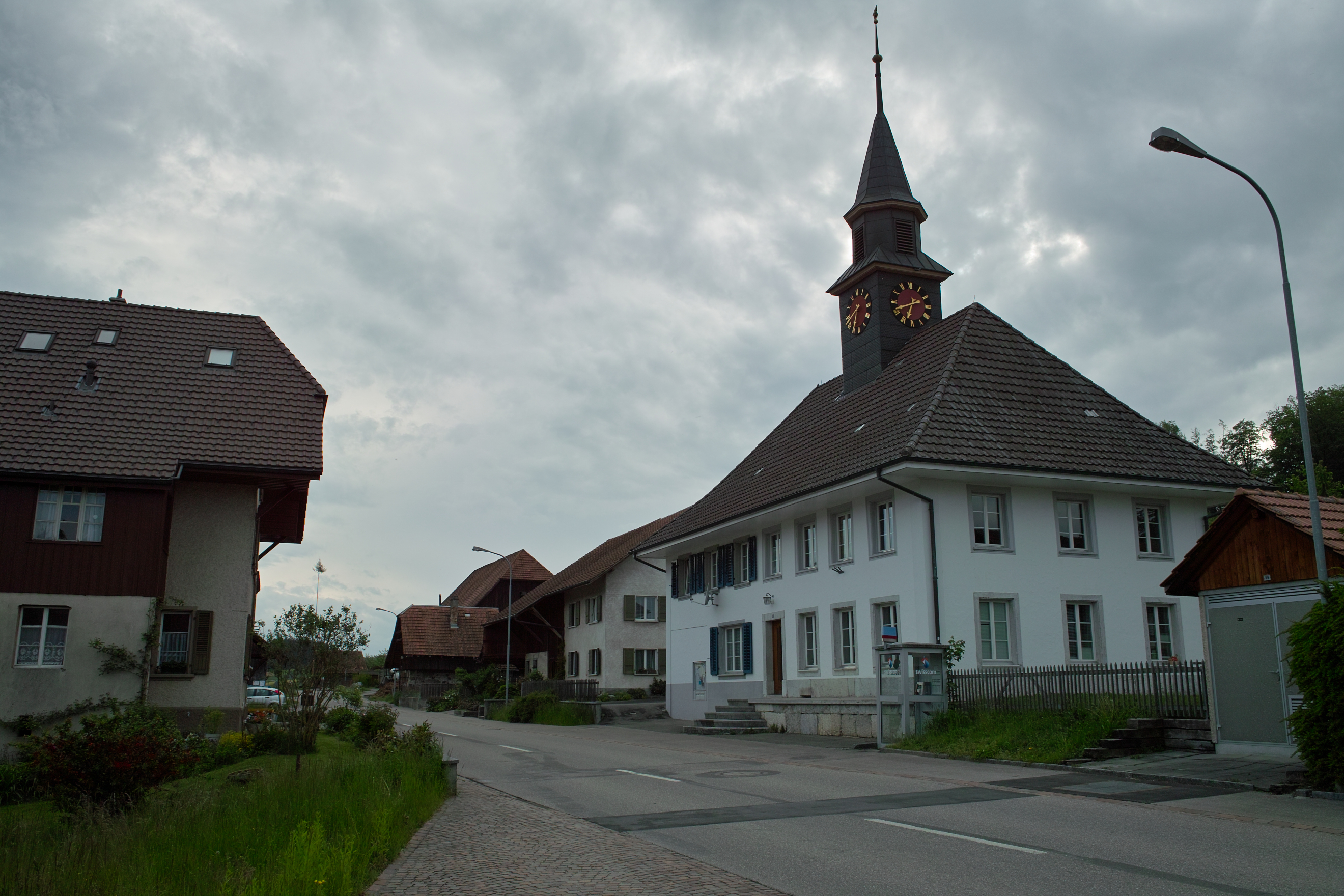

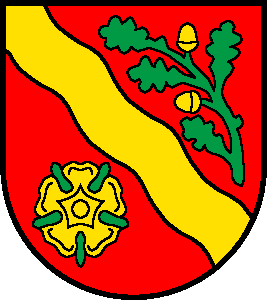
- Coat of arms
- Location of Bibern
- Location within Switzerland Location within Canton of Solothurn
- Coordinates: 47°9′N 7°28′E
- Country: Switzerland
- Canton: Solothurn
- District: Bucheggberg

Area
  - Total: 2.99 km^{2} (1.15 sq mi)
- Elevation: 512 m (1,680 ft)

Population (Dec 2011)
  - Total: 251
  - Density: 83.9/km^{2} (217/sq mi)
- Time zone: UTC+01:00 (CET)
  - Summer (DST): UTC+02:00 (CEST)
- Postal code: 4578
- SFOS number: 2444
- ISO 3166 code: CH-SO
- Surrounded by: Arch (BE), Gossliwil, Hessigkofen, Leuzigen (BE), Rüti bei Büren (BE), Tscheppach
- Website: www.bibern-so.ch

Bibern is a former municipality in the district of Bucheggberg, in the canton of Solothurn, Switzerland. On 1 January 2014 the former municipalities of Bibern (SO), Tscheppach, Brügglen, Aetingen, Aetigkofen, Gossliwil, Hessigkofen, Mühledorf (SO), Küttigkofen, Kyburg-Buchegg merged into the new municipality of Buchegg.

== History ==
Bibern is first mentioned in 1366 as ze Bibron.

== Geography ==
Before the merger, Bibern had a total area of 3.0 km^{2} (1.2 mi^{2}). Of this area, 1.85 km^{2} (0.71 sq mi) or 61.9% is used for agricultural purposes, while 0.9 km^{2} (0.35 sq mi) or 30.1% is forested. Of the rest of the land, 0.24 km^{2} (0.093 sq mi) or 8.0% is settled (buildings or roads), 0.01 km^{2} (2.5 acres) or 0.3% is either rivers or lakes.

Of the built up area, housing and buildings made up 3.7% and transportation infrastructure made up 3.7%. Out of the forested land, all of the forested land area is covered with heavy forests. Of the agricultural land, 40.1% is used for growing crops and 20.7% is pastures. All the water in the municipality is flowing water.

The former municipality is located in the Bucheggberg district, in the Bibern valley along the Bibernbach river. It consists of the linear village of Bibern.

== Coat of arms ==
The blazon of the municipal coat of arms is Gules a Bend wavy Or between an Oak Branch Vert acorned of the second and a Rose of the same barbed of the third.

== Demographics ==
Bibern had a population (as of 2011) of 251. As of 2008, 3.3% of the population are resident foreign nationals. Over the last 10 years (1999–2009 ) the population has changed at a rate of 11.9%.

Most of the population (as of 2000) speaks German (218 or 98.2%), with Spanish being second most common (3 or 1.4%) and Polish being third (1 or 0.5%).

As of 2008, the gender distribution of the population was 49.0% male and 51.0% female. The population was made up of 119 Swiss men (46.7% of the population) and 6 (2.4%) non-Swiss men. There were 127 Swiss women (49.8%) and 3 (1.2%) non-Swiss women. Of the population in the municipality 89 or about 40.1% were born in Bibern and lived there in 2000. There were 58 or 26.1% who were born in the same canton, while 61 or 27.5% were born somewhere else in Switzerland, and 8 or 3.6% were born outside of Switzerland.

In 2008 there were 4 live births to Swiss citizens. Ignoring immigration and emigration, the population of Swiss citizens increased by 4 while the foreign population remained the same. The total Swiss population change in 2008 (from all sources, including moves across municipal borders) was an increase of 8 and the non-Swiss population increased by 2 people. This represents a population growth rate of 4.3%.

The age distribution, as of 2000, in Bibern is; 18 children or 8.1% of the population are between 0 and 6 years old and 43 teenagers or 19.4% are between 7 and 19. Of the adult population, 14 people or 6.3% of the population are between 20 and 24 years old. 70 people or 31.5% are between 25 and 44, and 40 people or 18.0% are between 45 and 64. The senior population distribution is 30 people or 13.5% of the population are between 65 and 79 years old and there are 7 people or 3.2% who are over 80.

As of 2000, there were 102 people who were single and never married in the municipality. There were 96 married individuals, 12 widows or widowers and 12 individuals who are divorced.

In 2000 there were 35 single family homes (or 53.0% of the total) out of a total of 66 inhabited buildings. There were 11 multi-family buildings (16.7%), along with 16 multi-purpose buildings that were mostly used for housing (24.2%) and 4 other use buildings (commercial or industrial) that also had some housing (6.1%).

In 2000 there were 98 apartments in the municipality. Of these apartments, a total of 88 apartments (89.8% of the total) were permanently occupied, while 3 apartments (3.1%) were seasonally occupied and 7 apartments (7.1%) were empty. As of 2009, the construction rate of new housing units was 3.9 new units per 1000 residents. The vacancy rate for the municipality, in 2010, was 4.55%.

The historical population is given in the following chart:

== Politics ==
In the 2007 federal election the most popular party was the SVP which received 44.68% of the vote. The next three most popular parties were the FDP (27.96%), the SP (12.77%) and the Green Party (7.6%). In the federal election, a total of 95 votes were cast, and the voter turnout was 50.5%.

== Economy ==
As of 2010, Bibern had an unemployment rate of 2%. As of 2008, there were 35 people employed in the primary economic sector and about 11 businesses involved in this sector. 12 people were employed in the secondary sector and there were 4 businesses in this sector. 1 person was employed in the tertiary sector, with 1 business in this sector. There were 122 residents of the municipality who were employed in some capacity, of which females made up 45.1% of the workforce.

In 2008 the total number of full-time equivalent jobs was 34. The number of jobs in the primary sector was 22, all of which were in agriculture. The number of jobs in the secondary sector was 11 of which 6 or (54.5%) were in manufacturing and 6 (54.5%) were in construction. The number of jobs in the tertiary sector was 1, which was a technical professional or scientist.

In 2000, there were 15 workers who commuted into the municipality and 86 workers who commuted away. The municipality is a net exporter of workers, with about 5.7 workers leaving the municipality for every one entering. Of the working population, 3.3% used public transportation to get to work, and 68% used a private car.

== Religion ==
From the 2000 census, 15 or 6.8% were Roman Catholic, while 179 or 80.6% belonged to the Swiss Reformed Church. 24 (or about 10.81% of the population) belonged to no church, are agnostic or atheist, and 4 individuals (or about 1.80% of the population) did not answer the question.

== Education ==
In Bibern about 91 or (41.0%) of the population have completed non-mandatory upper secondary education, and 18 or (8.1%) have completed additional higher education (either university or a Fachhochschule). Of the 18 who completed tertiary schooling, 83.3% were Swiss men, 11.1% were Swiss women.

As of 2000, there were 13 students in Bibern who came from another municipality, while 24 residents attended schools outside the municipality.
