= Bucheggberg District =

District in Solothurn, Switzerland

Coordinates: 47°8′N 7°28′E

Bucheggberg District Bezirk Bucheggberg
- District
- Coat of arms

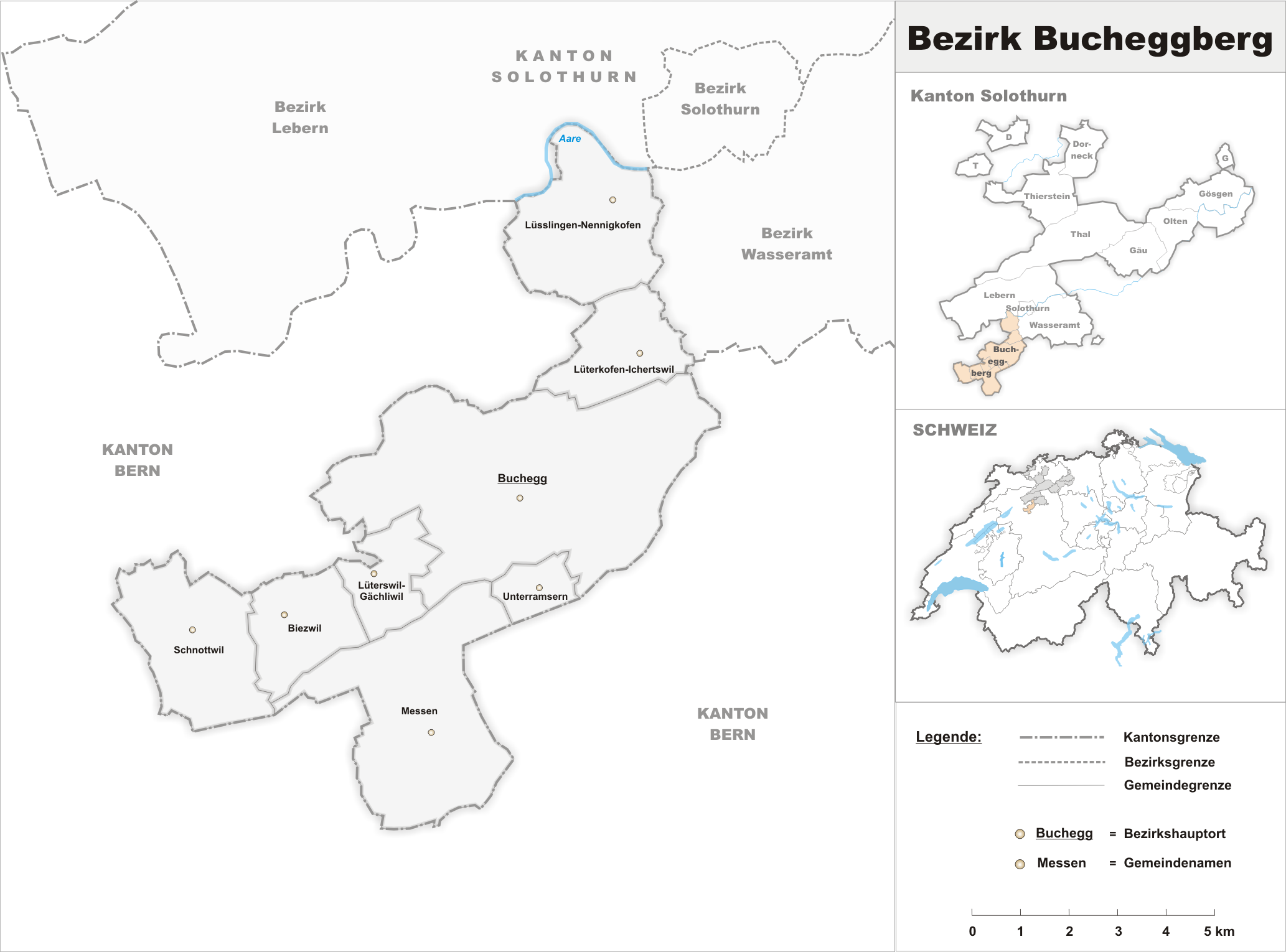
- Country: Switzerland
- Canton: Solothurn
- Capital: Buchegg

Area
  - Total: 62.86 km^{2} (24.27 sq mi)

Population (31 December 2020)
  - Total: 8,009
  - Density: 127.4/km^{2} (330.0/sq mi)
- Time zone: UTC+1 (CET)
  - Summer (DST): UTC+2 (CEST)
- Municipalities: 7

Bucheggberg District is one of the ten districts of the canton of Solothurn in Switzerland, situated to the southwest of the canton. Together with the Wasseramt District, it forms the Amtei (electoral district) of Wasseramt-Bucheggberg. It has a population of 8,009 (as of 31 December 2020).

== Municipalities ==
Bucheggberg District contains the following municipalities:

Coat of arms	Municipality	Population (31 December 2020)	Area, km^{2}
Biezwil	Biezwil	344	4.18
Buchegg	Buchegg	2,522	25.68
Lüsslingen-Nennigkofen	Lüsslingen-Nennigkofen	1,101	7.81
Lüterkofen-Ichertswil	Lüterkofen-Ichertswil	878	4.40
Messen	Messen	1,471	11.88
Schnottwil	Schnottwil	1,135	7.19
Unterramsern	Unterramsern	219	1.54
	Total	8,009	62.86

== Mergers ==
On 1 January 1961 the former municipalities of Lüterkofen and Ichertswil merged to form the new municipality of Lüterkofen-Ichertswil.

On 1 January 1995 the former municipalities of Gächliwil and Lüterswil merged to form the new municipality of Lüterswil-Gächliwil.

On 1 January 2010 the municipalities of Balm bei Messen, Brunnenthal, and Oberramsern merged into the municipality of Messen.

On 1 January 2013, Lüsslingen and Nennigkofen merged to form Lüsslingen-Nennigkofen.

On 1 January 2014 the former municipalities of Tscheppach, Brügglen, Aetingen, Aetigkofen, Bibern (SO), Gossliwil, Hessigkofen, Mühledorf (SO), Küttigkofen and Kyburg-Buchegg merged into the municipality of Buchegg.

On 1 January 2024 the former municipality of Lüterswil-Gächliwil merged into the municipality of Buchegg.

== Geography ==
Bucheggberg district has an area, as of 2009, of 62.81 square kilometers (24.25 sq mi). Of this area, 36.8 km^{2} (14.2 sq mi) or 58.6% is used for agricultural purposes, while 20.09 km^{2} (7.76 sq mi) or 32.0% is forested. Of the rest of the land, 5.35 km^{2} (2.07 sq mi) or 8.5% is settled (buildings or roads), 0.53 km^{2} (0.20 sq mi) or 0.8% is either rivers or lakes and 0.04 km^{2} (9.9 acres) or 0.1% is unproductive land.

Of the built up area, housing and buildings made up 4.3% and transportation infrastructure made up 2.9%. Out of the forested land, all of the forested land area is covered with heavy forests. Of the agricultural land, 57.2% is used for growing crops, while 1.4% is used for orchards or vine crops. All the water in the municipality is flowing water.

== Coat of arms ==
Coat of Arms

The blazon of the municipal coat of arms is Or three Roses Gules barbed and seeded proper in pale.

== Demographics ==
Bucheggberg district has a population (as of December 2020) of 8,009.

Most of the population (as of 2000) speaks German (6,909 or 97.4%), with French being second most common (63 or 0.9%) and English being third (15 or 0.2%). There are 4 people who speak Romansh.

As of 2008, the gender distribution of the population was 50.0% male and 50.0% female. The population was made up of 3,606 Swiss men (47.1% of the population) and 219 (2.9%) non-Swiss men. There were 3,639 Swiss women (47.5%) and 193 (2.5%) non-Swiss women. Of the population in the district 2,524 or about 35.6% were born in the district and lived there in 2000. There were 1,556 or 21.9% who were born in the same canton, while 2,483 or 35.0% were born somewhere else in Switzerland, and 356 or 5.0% were born outside of Switzerland.

In 2008 there were 77 live births to Swiss citizens and 4 births to non-Swiss citizens, and in same time span there were 55 deaths of Swiss citizens. Ignoring immigration and emigration, the population of Swiss citizens increased by 22 while the foreign population increased by 4. There were 4 Swiss men and 8 Swiss women who immigrated back to Switzerland. At the same time, there were 17 non-Swiss men and 17 non-Swiss women who immigrated from another country to Switzerland. The total Swiss population change in 2008 (from all sources, including moves across municipal borders) was an increase of 34 and the non-Swiss population increased by 33 people. This represents a population growth rate of 0.9%.

As of 2000, there were 2,935 people who were single and never married in the district. There were 3,499 married individuals, 371 widows or widowers and 287 individuals who are divorced.

There were 663 households that consist of only one person and 239 households with five or more people. Out of a total of 2,789 households that answered this question, 23.8% were households made up of just one person and 23 were adults who lived with their parents. Of the rest of the households, there are 858 married couples without children, 1,035 married couples with children There were 117 single parents with a child or children. There were 35 households that were made up unrelated people and 58 households that were made some sort of institution or another collective housing.

The historical population is given in the following chart:

== Politics ==
In the 2007 federal election the most popular party was the FDP which received 33.63% of the vote. The next three most popular parties were the SVP (25.26%), the SP (20.85%) and the Green Party (9.89%). In the federal election, a total of 3,113 votes were cast, and the voter turnout was 53.5%.

== Religion ==
From the 2000 census, 793 or 11.2% were Roman Catholic, while 5,269 or 74.3% belonged to the Swiss Reformed Church. Of the rest of the population, there were 16 members of an Orthodox church (or about 0.23% of the population), there were 28 individuals (or about 0.39% of the population) who belonged to the Christian Catholic Church, and there were 85 individuals (or about 1.20% of the population) who belonged to another Christian church. There were 32 (or about 0.45% of the population) who were Islamic. There were 9 individuals who were Buddhist and 2 individuals who belonged to another church. 723 (or about 10.19% of the population) belonged to no church, are agnostic or atheist, and 135 individuals (or about 1.90% of the population) did not answer the question.

== Education ==
In Bucheggberg about 2,933 or (41.4%) of the population have completed non-mandatory upper secondary education, and 984 or (13.9%) have completed additional higher education (either University or a Fachhochschule). Of the 984 who completed tertiary schooling, 72.5% were Swiss men, 24.6% were Swiss women, 1.9% were non-Swiss men and 1.0% were non-Swiss women.
