= Kyburg-Buchegg =

- Former municipality
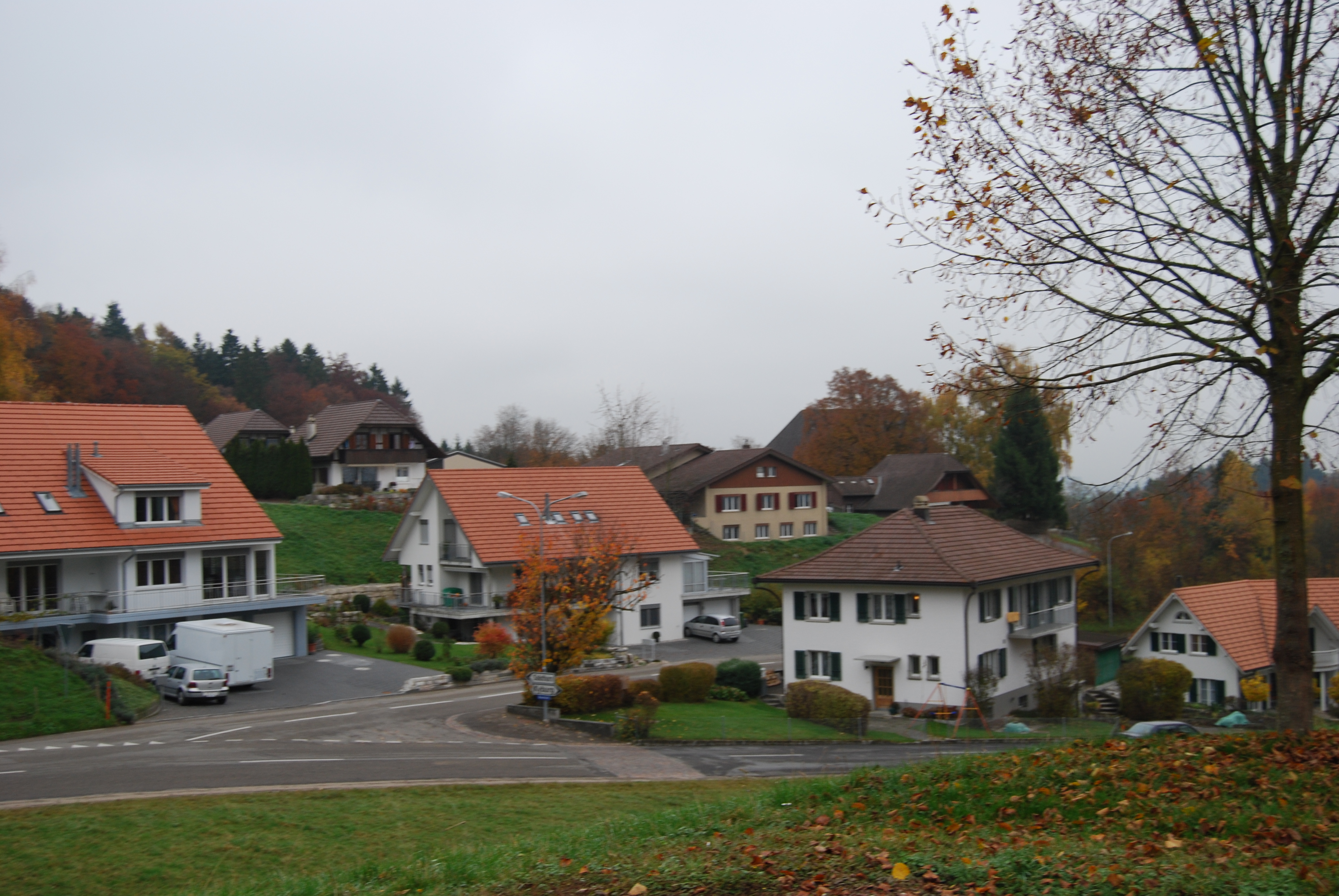

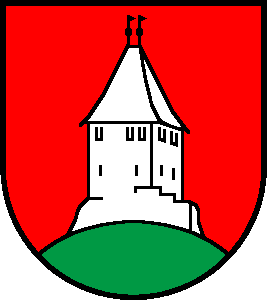
- Coat of arms
- Location of Kyburg-Buchegg
- Location within Switzerland Location within Canton of Solothurn
- Coordinates: 47°9′N 7°31′E
- Country: Switzerland
- Canton: Solothurn
- District: Bucheggberg

Area
  - Total: 1.61 km^{2} (0.62 sq mi)
- Elevation: 545 m (1,788 ft)

Population (Dec 2011)
  - Total: 342
  - Density: 212/km^{2} (550/sq mi)
- Time zone: UTC+01:00 (CET)
  - Summer (DST): UTC+02:00 (CEST)
- Postal code: 4586
- SFOS number: 2453
- ISO 3166 code: CH-SO
- Surrounded by: Aetingen, Bätterkinden (BE), Brügglen, Küttigkofen
- Website: www.kyburg-buchegg.ch

Kyburg-Buchegg is a former municipality in the district of Bucheggberg, in the canton of Solothurn, Switzerland. On 1 January 2014 the former municipalities of Kyburg-Buchegg, Tscheppach, Brügglen, Aetingen, Aetigkofen, Bibern (SO), Gossliwil, Hessigkofen, Mühledorf (SO), Küttigkofen merged into the new municipality of Buchegg.

== History ==
Kyburg-Buchegg is first mentioned in 1175 as Ernaldus de Boucecca.

== Geography ==
Before the merger, Kyburg-Buchegg had a total area of 1.6 km^{2} (0.62 mi^{2}). Of this area, 1.01 km^{2} (0.39 sq mi) or 63.1% is used for agricultural purposes, while 0.4 km^{2} (0.15 sq mi) or 25.0% is forested. Of the rest of the land, 0.2 km^{2} (0.077 sq mi) or 12.5% is settled (buildings or roads), 0.03 km^{2} (7.4 acres) or 1.9% is either rivers or lakes.

Of the built up area, housing and buildings made up 6.3% and transportation infrastructure made up 5.0%. Power and water infrastructure as well as other special developed areas made up 1.3% of the area Out of the forested land, 21.9% of the total land area is heavily forested and 3.1% is covered with orchards or small clusters of trees. Of the agricultural land, 46.9% is used for growing crops and 16.3% is pastures. All the water in the municipality is flowing water.

The former municipality is located in the Bucheggberg district. It comprises the two villages of Kyburg and Buchegg. Kyburg is the easternmost municipality on the northern edge of the Limpach valley. Buchegg is located below Kyburg on a plateau west of Buchegg Castle.

== Coat of arms ==
The blazon of the municipal coat of arms is Gules Tower of "Bucheggschloss" Argent on a Mount Vert.

== Demographics ==
Kyburg-Buchegg had a population (as of 2011) of 342. As of 2008, 6.0% of the population are resident foreign nationals. Over the last 10 years (1999–2009 ) the population has changed at a rate of -1.5%.

Most of the population (as of 2000) speaks German (327 or 98.2%), with French being second most common (2 or 0.6%) and Romansh being third (1 or 0.3%).

As of 2008, the gender distribution of the population was 49.6% male and 50.4% female. The population was made up of 157 Swiss men (46.0% of the population) and 12 (3.5%) non-Swiss men. There were 154 Swiss women (45.2%) and 18 (5.3%) non-Swiss women. Of the population in the municipality 112 or about 33.6% were born in Kyburg-Buchegg and lived there in 2000. There were 100 or 30.0% who were born in the same canton, while 101 or 30.3% were born somewhere else in Switzerland, and 16 or 4.8% were born outside of Switzerland.

In 2008 there were 3 live births to Swiss citizens and were 3 deaths of Swiss citizens. Ignoring immigration and emigration, the population of Swiss citizens remained the same while the foreign population remained the same. There was 1 Swiss man and 1 Swiss woman who immigrated back to Switzerland. At the same time, there were 3 non-Swiss men and 2 non-Swiss women who immigrated from another country to Switzerland. The total Swiss population change in 2008 (from all sources, including moves across municipal borders) was a decrease of 4 and the non-Swiss population increased by 7 people. This represents a population growth rate of 0.9%.

The age distribution, as of 2000, in Kyburg-Buchegg is; 29 children or 8.7% of the population are between 0 and 6 years old and 68 teenagers or 20.4% are between 7 and 19. Of the adult population, 20 people or 6.0% of the population are between 20 and 24 years old. 80 people or 24.0% are between 25 and 44, and 92 people or 27.6% are between 45 and 64. The senior population distribution is 28 people or 8.4% of the population are between 65 and 79 years old and there are 16 people or 4.8% who are over 80.

As of 2000, there were 148 people who were single and never married in the municipality. There were 155 married individuals, 18 widows or widowers and 12 individuals who are divorced.

In 2000 there were 68 single family homes (or 64.2% of the total) out of a total of 106 inhabited buildings. There were 13 multi-family buildings (12.3%), along with 15 multi-purpose buildings that were mostly used for housing (14.2%) and 10 other use buildings (commercial or industrial) that also had some housing (9.4%).

In 2000 there were 135 apartments in the municipality. Of these apartments, a total of 112 apartments (83.0% of the total) were permanently occupied, while 19 apartments (14.1%) were seasonally occupied and 4 apartments (3.0%) were empty. As of 2009, the construction rate of new housing units was 6.1 new units per 1000 residents. The vacancy rate for the municipality, in 2010, was 1.34%.

The historical population is given in the following chart:

== Politics ==
In the 2007 federal election the most popular party was the SVP which received 29.57% of the vote. The next three most popular parties were the FDP (26.57%), the SP (24.1%) and the Green Party (9.71%). In the federal election, a total of 165 votes were cast, and the voter turnout was 63.0%.

== Economy ==
As of 2010, Kyburg-Buchegg had an unemployment rate of 1.3%. As of 2008, there were 12 people employed in the primary economic sector and about 4 businesses involved in this sector. 14 people were employed in the secondary sector and there were 5 businesses in this sector. 159 people were employed in the tertiary sector, with 7 businesses in this sector. There were 173 residents of the municipality who were employed in some capacity, of which females made up 44.5% of the workforce.

In 2008 the total number of full-time equivalent jobs was 146. The number of jobs in the primary sector was 8, all of which were in agriculture. The number of jobs in the secondary sector was 11 of which 5 or (45.5%) were in manufacturing and 7 (63.6%) were in construction. The number of jobs in the tertiary sector was 127. In the tertiary sector; 10 or 7.9% were in a hotel or restaurant, 4 or 3.1% were in the information industry, 6 or 4.7% were in education and 108 or 85.0% were in health care.

In 2000, there were 102 workers who commuted into the municipality and 128 workers who commuted away. The municipality is a net exporter of workers, with about 1.3 workers leaving the municipality for every one entering. Of the working population, 11.6% used public transportation to get to work, and 59% used a private car.

== Religion ==
From the 2000 census, 47 or 14.1% were Roman Catholic, while 207 or 62.2% belonged to the Swiss Reformed Church. Of the rest of the population, there were 5 individuals (or about 1.50% of the population) who belonged to the Christian Catholic Church, and there were 23 individuals (or about 6.91% of the population) who belonged to another Christian church. There was 1 individual who was Islamic. 48 (or about 14.41% of the population) belonged to no church, are agnostic or atheist, and 2 individuals (or about 0.60% of the population) did not answer the question.

== Education ==
In Kyburg-Buchegg about 137 or (41.1%) of the population have completed non-mandatory upper secondary education, and 51 or (15.3%) have completed additional higher education (either university or a Fachhochschule). Of the 51 who completed tertiary schooling, 68.6% were Swiss men, 23.5% were Swiss women.

As of 2000, there were 21 students in Kyburg-Buchegg who came from another municipality, while 44 residents attended schools outside the municipality.
