= Mühledorf, Solothurn =

Mühledorf
- Former municipality
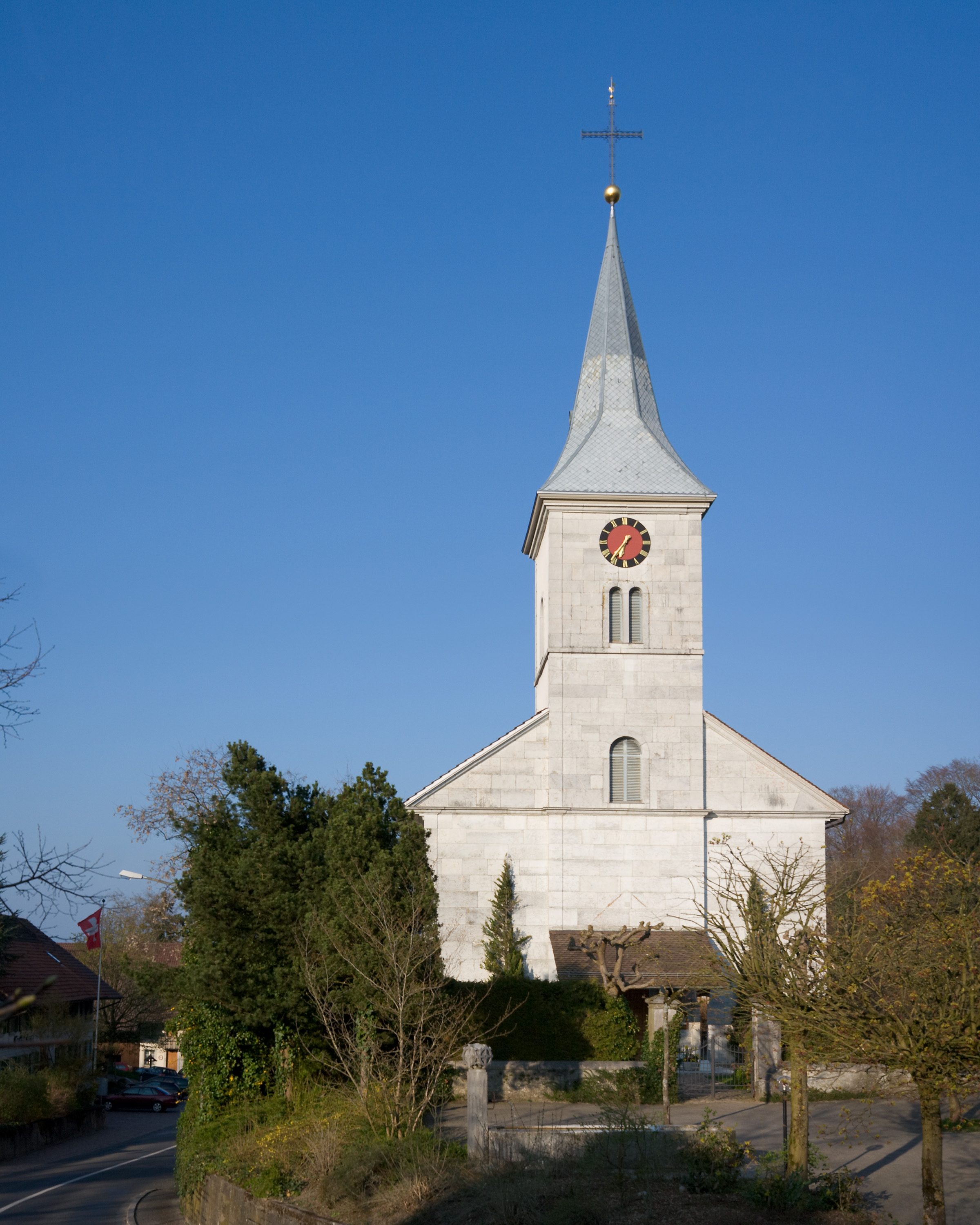

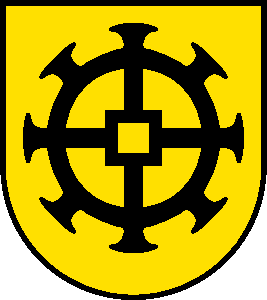
- Coat of arms
- Location of Mühledorf
- Location within Switzerland Location within Canton of Solothurn
- Coordinates: 47°08′N 7°29′E
- Country: Switzerland
- Canton: Solothurn
- District: Bucheggberg

Area
  - Total: 3.28 km^{2} (1.27 sq mi)
- Elevation: 557 m (1,827 ft)

Population (Dec 2011)
  - Total: 336
  - Density: 102/km^{2} (265/sq mi)
- Time zone: UTC+01:00 (CET)
  - Summer (DST): UTC+02:00 (CEST)
- Postal code: 4583
- SFOS number: 2458
- ISO 3166 code: CH-SO
- Surrounded by: Aetigkofen, Aetingen, Brügglen, Hessigkofen, Lüterswil-Gächliwil, Tscheppach, Unterramsern
- Website: www.buchegg-so.ch

Mühledorf is a former municipality in the Bucheggberg District, in the canton of Solothurn, Switzerland. On 1 January 2014 the former municipalities of Mühledorf (SO), Tscheppach, Brügglen, Aetingen, Aetigkofen, Bibern (SO), Gossliwil, Hessigkofen, Küttigkofen, Kyburg-Buchegg merged into the new municipality of Buchegg.

== History ==
Mühledorf is first mentioned around 1264 as Mulidorf though this is from a copy from 1415-20. In 1276 it was mentioned as Mvlidorf.

== Geography ==
Aerial view (1949)

Before the merger, Mühledorf had a total area of 3.3 km^{2} (1.3 mi^{2}). Of this area, 1.8 km^{2} (0.69 sq mi) or 54.9% is used for agricultural purposes, while 1.26 km^{2} (0.49 sq mi) or 38.4% is forested. Of the rest of the land, 0.25 km^{2} (0.097 sq mi) or 7.6% is settled (buildings or roads) and 0.01 km^{2} (2.5 acres) or 0.3% is unproductive land.

Of the built up area, housing and buildings made up 4.9% and transportation infrastructure made up 1.8%. Out of the forested land, 37.2% of the total land area is heavily forested and 1.2% is covered with orchards or small clusters of trees. Of the agricultural land, 35.1% is used for growing crops and 17.1% is pastures, while 2.7% is used for orchards or vine crops.

The former municipality is located in the Bucheggberg district, in the Mühle valley. It consists of the linear village of Mühledorf.

== Coat of arms ==
The blazon of the municipal coat of arms is Or a Mill-Wheel Sable.

== Demographics ==
Mühledorf had a population (as of 2011) of 336. As of 2008, 0.9% of the population are resident foreign nationals. Over the last 10 years (1999–2009) the population has changed at a rate of 1.5%.

Most of the population (as of 2000) speaks German (321 or 97.9%), with French being second most common (4 or 1.2%) and Italian being third (1 or 0.3%).

As of 2008, the gender distribution of the population was 48.5% male and 51.5% female. The population was made up of 163 Swiss men (47.4% of the population) and 4 (1.2%) non-Swiss men. There were 171 Swiss women (49.7%) and 6 (1.7%) non-Swiss women. Of the population in the municipality 102 or about 31.1% were born in Mühledorf and lived there in 2000. There were 89 or 27.1% who were born in the same canton, while 124 or 37.8% were born somewhere else in Switzerland, and 10 or 3.0% were born outside of Switzerland.

In 2008 there were 4 live births to Swiss citizens and were 4 deaths of Swiss citizens. Ignoring immigration and emigration, the population of Swiss citizens remained the same while the foreign population remained the same. There were 2 Swiss men who immigrated back to Switzerland. At the same time, there were 2 non-Swiss men who immigrated from another country to Switzerland. The total Swiss population change in 2008 (from all sources, including moves across municipal borders) was a decrease of 14 and the non-Swiss population increased by 1 person. This represents a population growth rate of -3.6%.

The age distribution, as of 2000, in Mühledorf is; 30 children or 9.1% of the population are between 0 and 6 years old and 73 teenagers or 22.3% are between 7 and 19. Of the adult population, 21 people or 6.4% of the population are between 20 and 24 years old. 94 people or 28.7% are between 25 and 44, and 72 people or 22.0% are between 45 and 64. The senior population distribution is 26 people or 7.9% of the population are between 65 and 79 years old and there are 12 people or 3.7% who are over 80.

As of 2000, there were 142 people who were single and never married in the municipality. There were 154 married individuals, 20 widows or widowers and 12 individuals who are divorced.

In 2000 there were 54 single family homes (or 52.4% of the total) out of a total of 103 inhabited buildings. There were 12 multi-family buildings (11.7%), along with 29 multi-purpose buildings that were mostly used for housing (28.2%) and 8 other use buildings (commercial or industrial) that also had some housing (7.8%).

In 2000 there were 132 apartments in the municipality. Of these apartments, a total of 113 apartments (85.6% of the total) were permanently occupied, while 11 apartments (8.3%) were seasonally occupied and 8 apartments (6.1%) were empty. As of 2009, the construction rate of new housing units was 2.9 new units per 1000 residents. The vacancy rate for the municipality, in 2010, was 0.71%.

The historical population is given in the following chart:

== Politics ==
In the 2007 federal election the most popular party was the FDP which received 34.8% of the vote. The next three most popular parties were the SP (22.97%), the SVP (22.28%) and the Green Party (11.05%). In the federal election, a total of 167 votes were cast, and the voter turnout was 59.9%.

== Economy ==
As of 2010, Mühledorf had an unemployment rate of 1.9%. As of 2008, there were 40 people employed in the primary economic sector and about 14 businesses involved in this sector. 20 people were employed in the secondary sector and there were 6 businesses in this sector. 62 people were employed in the tertiary sector, with 8 businesses in this sector. There were 173 residents of the municipality who were employed in some capacity, of which females made up 46.2% of the workforce.

In 2008 the total number of full-time equivalent jobs was 85. The number of jobs in the primary sector was 28, of which 22 were in agriculture and 6 were in forestry or lumber production. The number of jobs in the secondary sector was 16 of which 9 or (56.3%) were in manufacturing and 7 (43.8%) were in construction. The number of jobs in the tertiary sector was 41. In the tertiary sector; 12 or 29.3% were in wholesale or retail sales or the repair of motor vehicles, 8 or 19.5% were in the movement and storage of goods, 12 or 29.3% were in a hotel or restaurant, 4 or 9.8% were technical professionals or scientists, .

In 2000, there were 67 workers who commuted into the municipality and 107 workers who commuted away. The municipality is a net exporter of workers, with about 1.6 workers leaving the municipality for every one entering. Of the working population, 11% used public transportation to get to work, and 56.6% used a private car.

== Religion ==
From the 2000 census, 38 or 11.6% were Roman Catholic, while 241 or 73.5% belonged to the Swiss Reformed Church. Of the rest of the population, and there were 2 individuals (or about 0.61% of the population) who belonged to another Christian church. 40 (or about 12.20% of the population) belonged to no church, are agnostic or atheist, and 7 individuals (or about 2.13% of the population) did not answer the question.

== Education ==
In Mühledorf about 135 or (41.2%) of the population have completed non-mandatory upper secondary education, and 46 or (14.0%) have completed additional higher education (either university or a Fachhochschule). Of the 46 who completed tertiary schooling, 69.6% were Swiss men, 28.3% were Swiss women.

As of 2000, there was one student in Mühledorf who came from another municipality, while 69 residents attended schools outside the municipality.
