= Lüterkofen-Ichertswil =

- Municipality
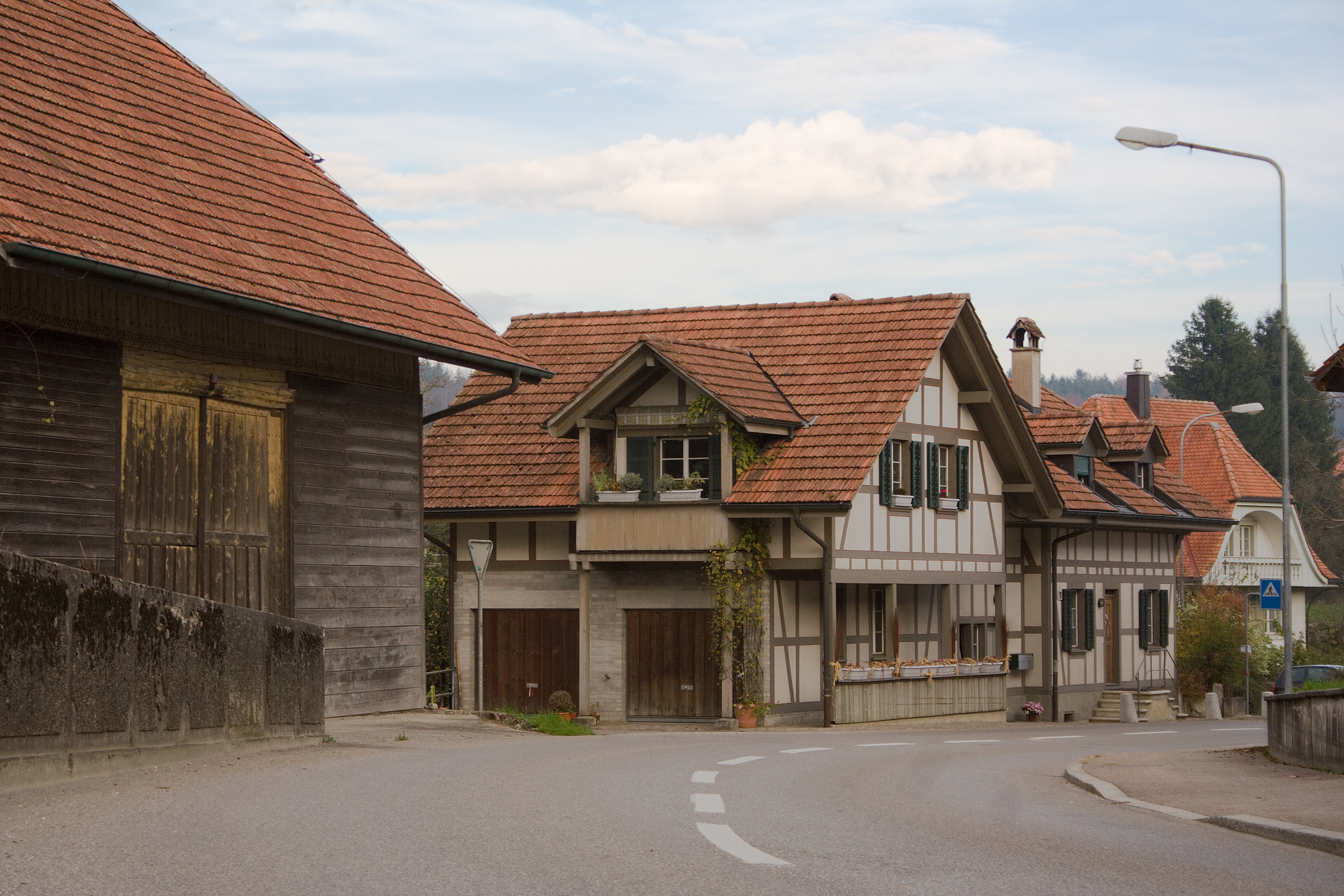
- Lüterkofen village

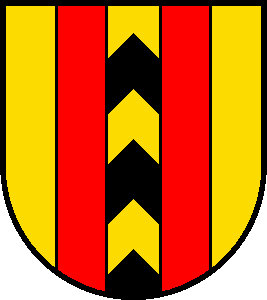
- Coat of arms
- Location of Lüterkofen-Ichertswil
- Location within Switzerland Location within Canton of Solothurn
- Coordinates: 47°10′N 7°31′E
- Country: Switzerland
- Canton: Solothurn
- District: Bucheggberg

Area
  - Total: 4.42 km^{2} (1.71 sq mi)
- Elevation: 473 m (1,552 ft)

Population (December 2020)
  - Total: 878
  - Density: 199/km^{2} (514/sq mi)
- Time zone: UTC+01:00 (CET)
  - Summer (DST): UTC+02:00 (CEST)
- Postal code: 4571
- SFOS number: 2455
- ISO 3166 code: CH-SO
- Surrounded by: Bätterkinden (BE), Brügglen, Küttigkofen, Leuzigen (BE), Lohn-Ammannsegg, Lüsslingen, Nennigkofen, Tscheppach
- Website: www.lueterkofen-ichertswil.ch

Lüterkofen-Ichertswil is a municipality in the district of Bucheggberg, in the canton of Solothurn, Switzerland. It was formed in 1961 from the merger of the two previously independent municipalities of Lüterkofen and Ichertswil.

== History ==
Lüterkofen is first mentioned in 1325 as in Luterkon. Ichertswil is first mentioned in 1148 as Hisenharteswilare.

== Geography ==
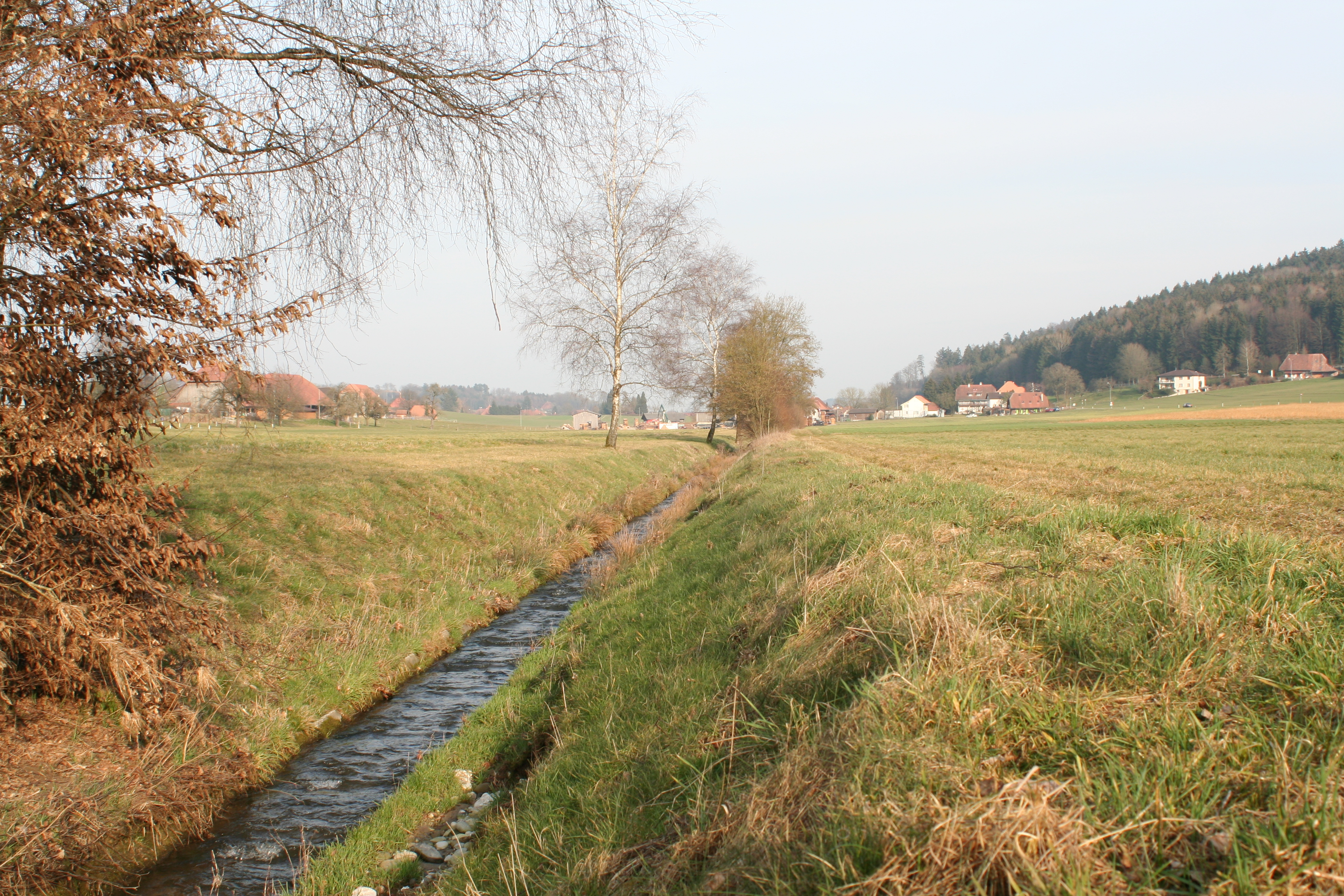
Biberenbach river near Lüterkofen-Ichertswil

Lüterkofen-Ichertswil has an area, as of 2009, of 4.42 square kilometers (1.71 sq mi). Of this area, 2.32 km^{2} (0.90 sq mi) or 52.5% is used for agricultural purposes, while 1.48 km^{2} (0.57 sq mi) or 33.5% is forested. Of the rest of the land, 0.56 km^{2} (0.22 sq mi) or 12.7% is settled (buildings or roads), 0.02 km^{2} (4.9 acres) or 0.5% is either rivers or lakes.

Of the built up area, housing and buildings made up 5.4% and transportation infrastructure made up 4.1%. Power and water infrastructure as well as other special developed areas made up 2.5% of the area Out of the forested land, all of the forested land area is covered with heavy forests. Of the agricultural land, 31.0% is used for growing crops and 19.7% is pastures, while 1.8% is used for orchards or vine crops. All the water in the municipality is flowing water.

The municipality is located in the Bucheggberg district. It was created in 1961 through the merger of Ichertswil and Lüterkofen.

== Coat of arms ==
The blazon of the municipal coat of arms is Pally of five Or and Gules, on the middle Pale Or three Chevrons Sable

== Demographics ==
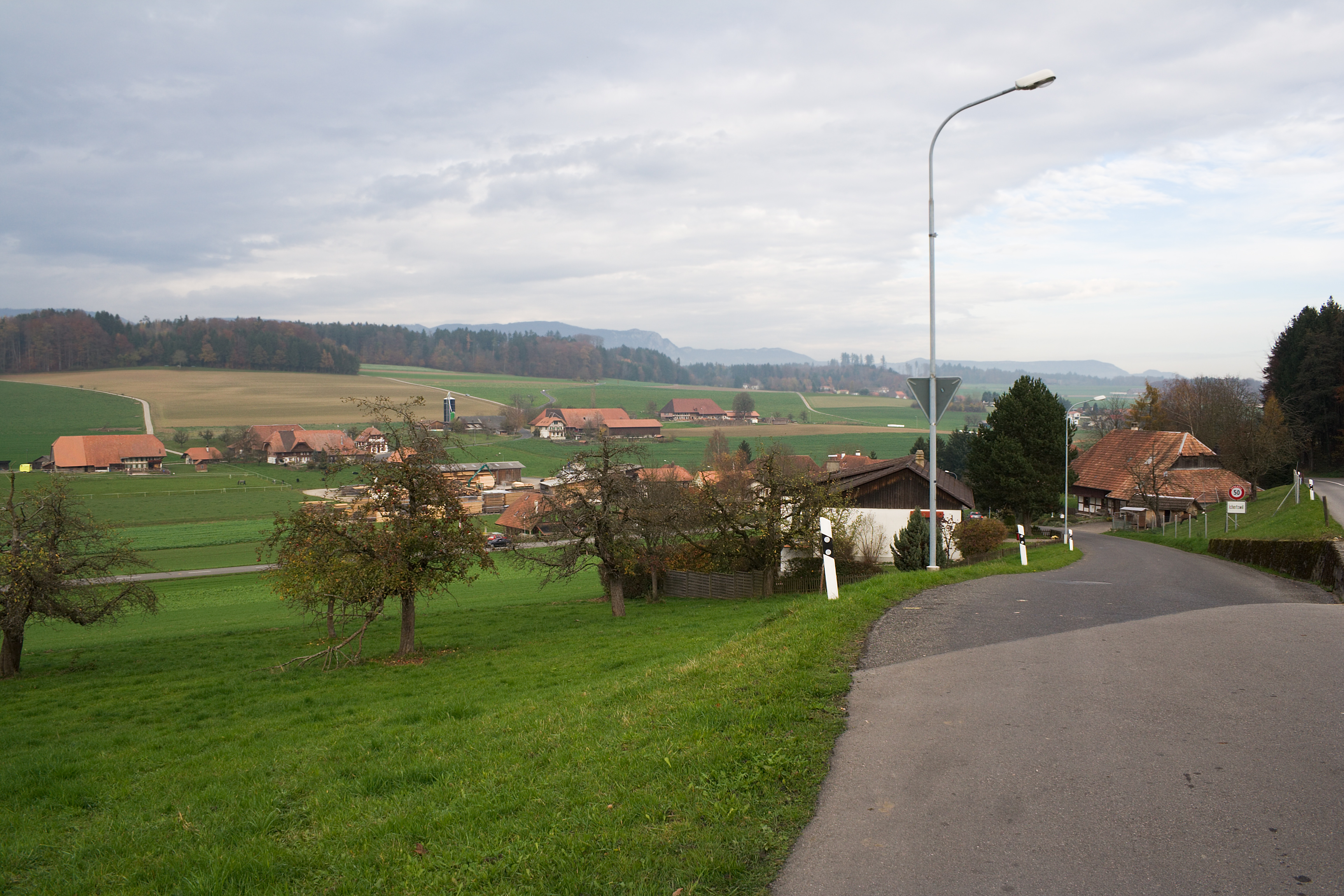
Ichertswil

Lüterkofen-Ichertswil has a population (as of December 2020) of 878. As of 2008, 4.9% of the population are resident foreign nationals. Over the last 10 years (1999–2009 ) the population has changed at a rate of 11%.

Most of the population (as of 2000) speaks German (626 or 97.7%), with French being second most common (5 or 0.8%) and Dutch being third (2 or 0.3%).

As of 2008, the gender distribution of the population was 49.9% male and 50.1% female. The population was made up of 348 Swiss men (46.5% of the population) and 26 (3.5%) non-Swiss men. There were 350 Swiss women (46.7%) and 25 (3.3%) non-Swiss women. Of the population in the municipality 188 or about 29.3% were born in Lüterkofen-Ichertswil and lived there in 2000. There were 216 or 33.7% who were born in the same canton, while 192 or 30.0% were born somewhere else in Switzerland, and 33 or 5.1% were born outside of Switzerland.

In 2008 there were 5 live births to Swiss citizens and were 4 deaths of Swiss citizens. Ignoring immigration and emigration, the population of Swiss citizens increased by 1 while the foreign population remained the same. There were 2 Swiss men and 3 Swiss women who immigrated back to Switzerland. At the same time, there were 5 non-Swiss men and 4 non-Swiss women who immigrated from another country to Switzerland. The total Swiss population change in 2008 (from all sources, including moves across municipal borders) was an increase of 4 and the non-Swiss population increased by 7 people. This represents a population growth rate of 1.5%.

The age distribution, as of 2000, in Lüterkofen-Ichertswil is; 31 children or 4.8% of the population are between 0 and 6 years old and 94 teenagers or 14.7% are between 7 and 19. Of the adult population, 29 people or 4.5% of the population are between 20 and 24 years old. 176 people or 27.5% are between 25 and 44, and 215 people or 33.5% are between 45 and 64. The senior population distribution is 71 people or 11.1% of the population are between 65 and 79 years old and there are 25 people or 3.9% who are over 80.

As of 2000, there were 237 people who were single and never married in the municipality. There were 330 married individuals, 38 widows or widowers and 36 individuals who are divorced.

As of 2000, there were 270 private households in the municipality, and an average of 2.4 persons per household. There were 71 households that consist of only one person and 15 households with five or more people. Out of a total of 272 households that answered this question, 26.1% were households made up of just one person and there were 5 adults who lived with their parents. Of the rest of the households, there are 95 married couples without children, 83 married couples with children There were 14 single parents with a child or children. There were 2 households that were made up of unrelated people and 2 households that were made up of some sort of institution or another collective housing.

In 2000 there were 135 single family homes (or 64.0% of the total) out of a total of 211 inhabited buildings. There were 35 multi-family buildings (16.6%), along with 37 multi-purpose buildings that were mostly used for housing (17.5%) and 4 other use buildings (commercial or industrial) that also had some housing (1.9%). Of the single family homes 18 were built before 1919, while 16 were built between 1990 and 2000. The greatest number of single family homes (41) were built between 1971 and 1980.

In 2000 there were 282 apartments in the municipality. The most common apartment size was 4 rooms of which there were 75. There were 4 single room apartments and 150 apartments with five or more rooms. Of these apartments, a total of 261 apartments (92.6% of the total) were permanently occupied, while 18 apartments (6.4%) were seasonally occupied and 3 apartments (1.1%) were empty. As of 2009, the construction rate of new housing units was 2.7 new units per 1000 residents. The vacancy rate for the municipality, in 2010, was 0%.

The historical population is given in the following chart:

== Politics ==
In the 2007 federal election the most popular party was the FDP which received 39.43% of the vote. The next three most popular parties were the SVP (20.25%), the SP (19.09%) and the Green Party (9.68%). In the federal election, a total of 314 votes were cast, and the voter turnout was 53.6%.

== Economy ==
As of 2010, Lüterkofen-Ichertswil had an unemployment rate of 1.2%. As of 2008, there were 34 people employed in the primary economic sector and about 16 businesses involved in this sector. 30 people were employed in the secondary sector and there were 5 businesses in this sector. 68 people were employed in the tertiary sector, with 21 businesses in this sector. There were 377 residents of the municipality who were employed in some capacity, of which females made up 43.2% of the workforce.

In 2008 the total number of full-time equivalent jobs was 102. The number of jobs in the primary sector was 22, all of which were in agriculture. The number of jobs in the secondary sector was 28 of which 8 or (28.6%) were in manufacturing and 20 (71.4%) were in construction. The number of jobs in the tertiary sector was 52. In the tertiary sector; 17 or 32.7% were in wholesale or retail sales or the repair of motor vehicles, 9 or 17.3% were in a hotel or restaurant, 1 was in the information industry, 6 or 11.5% were technical professionals or scientists, 6 or 11.5% were in education and 2 or 3.8% were in health care.

In 2000, there were 46 workers who commuted into the municipality and 281 workers who commuted away. The municipality is a net exporter of workers, with about 6.1 workers leaving the municipality for every one entering. Of the working population, 13.5% used public transportation to get to work, and 59.7% used a private car.

== Religion ==
From the 2000 census, 95 or 14.8% were Roman Catholic, while 426 or 66.5% belonged to the Swiss Reformed Church. Of the rest of the population, there were 3 members of an Orthodox church (or about 0.47% of the population), there was 1 individual who belongs to the Christian Catholic Church, and there were 7 individuals (or about 1.09% of the population) who belonged to another Christian church. There was 1 person who was Buddhist and 1 individual who belonged to another church. 97 (or about 15.13% of the population) belonged to no church, are agnostic or atheist, and 10 individuals (or about 1.56% of the population) did not answer the question.

== Education ==
In Lüterkofen-Ichertswil about 312 or (48.7%) of the population have completed non-mandatory upper secondary education, and 81 or (12.6%) have completed additional higher education (either university or a Fachhochschule). Of the 81 who completed tertiary schooling, 75.3% were Swiss men, 21.0% were Swiss women.

As of 2000, there was one student in Lüterkofen-Ichertswil who came from another municipality, while 76 residents attended schools outside the municipality.

== Notable people ==
20th C

- Werner Ingold (1919–1995) a Swiss chemist and entrepreneur
