= Lüsslingen-Nennigkofen =

- Municipality
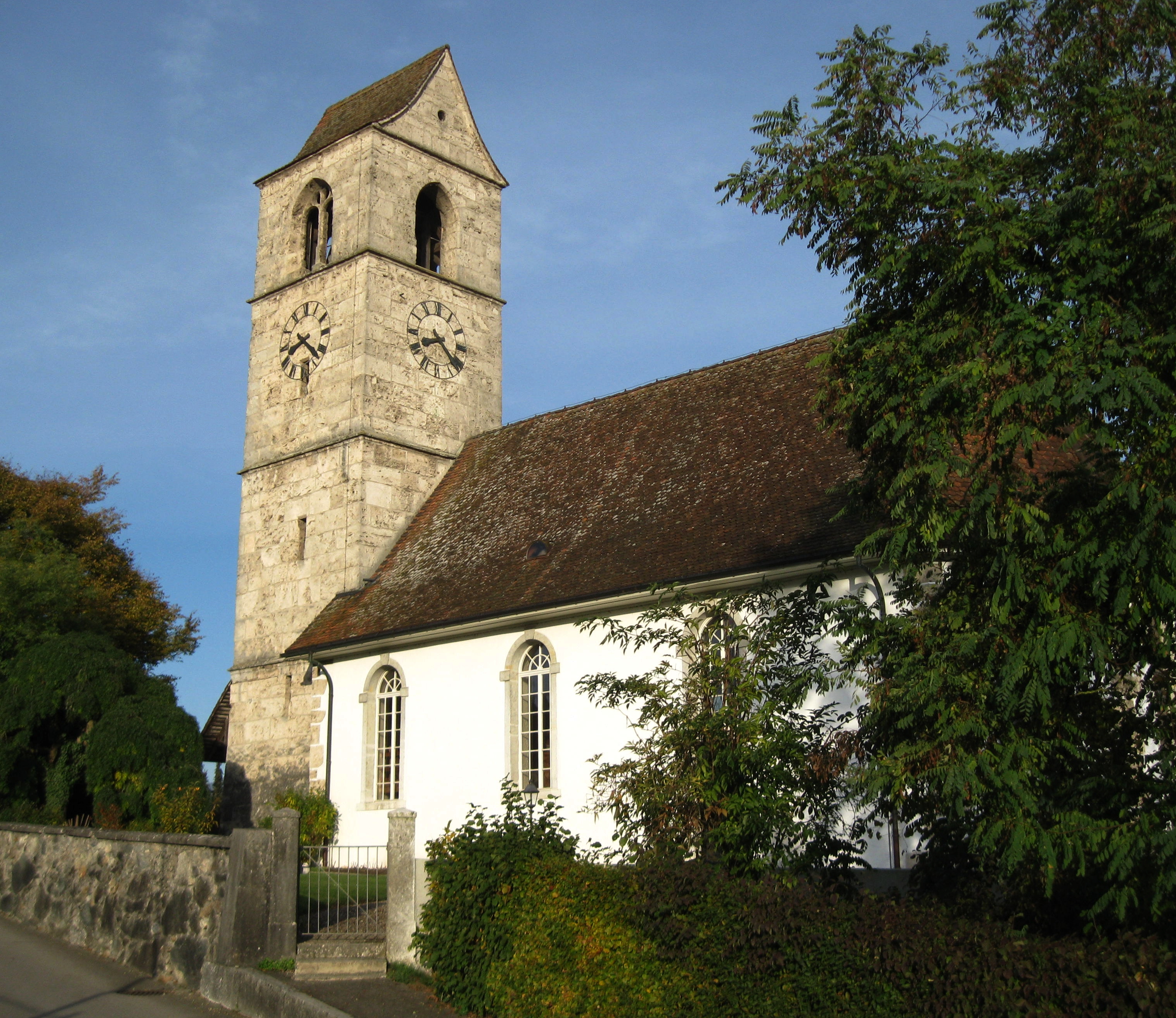
- Lüsslingen village church

- Coat of arms
- Location of Lüsslingen-Nennigkofen
- Location within Switzerland Location within Canton of Solothurn
- Coordinates: 47°11′N 7°30′E
- Country: Switzerland
- Canton: Solothurn
- District: Bucheggberg

Area
  - Total: 7.81 km^{2} (3.02 sq mi)

Population (Dec 2011)
  - Total: 998
  - Density: 128/km^{2} (331/sq mi)
- Time zone: UTC+01:00 (CET)
  - Summer (DST): UTC+02:00 (CEST)
- Postal code: 4574
- SFOS number: 2464
- ISO 3166 code: CH-SO
- Surrounded by: Bellach, Biberist, Leuzigen (BE), Lohn-Ammannsegg, Lüterkofen-Ichertswil, Selzach
- Website: https://www.luesslingen-nennigkofen.ch SFSO statistics

Lüsslingen-Nennigkofen is a municipality in the district of Bucheggberg, in the canton of Solothurn, Switzerland. On 1 January 2013, Lüsslingen and Nennigkofen merged to form Lüsslingen-Nennigkofen.

== History ==
Lüsslingen is first mentioned in 1251 as in Luslingen. Nennigkofen is first mentioned in 1392 as Nennikofen or Nennikoven.

== Geography ==
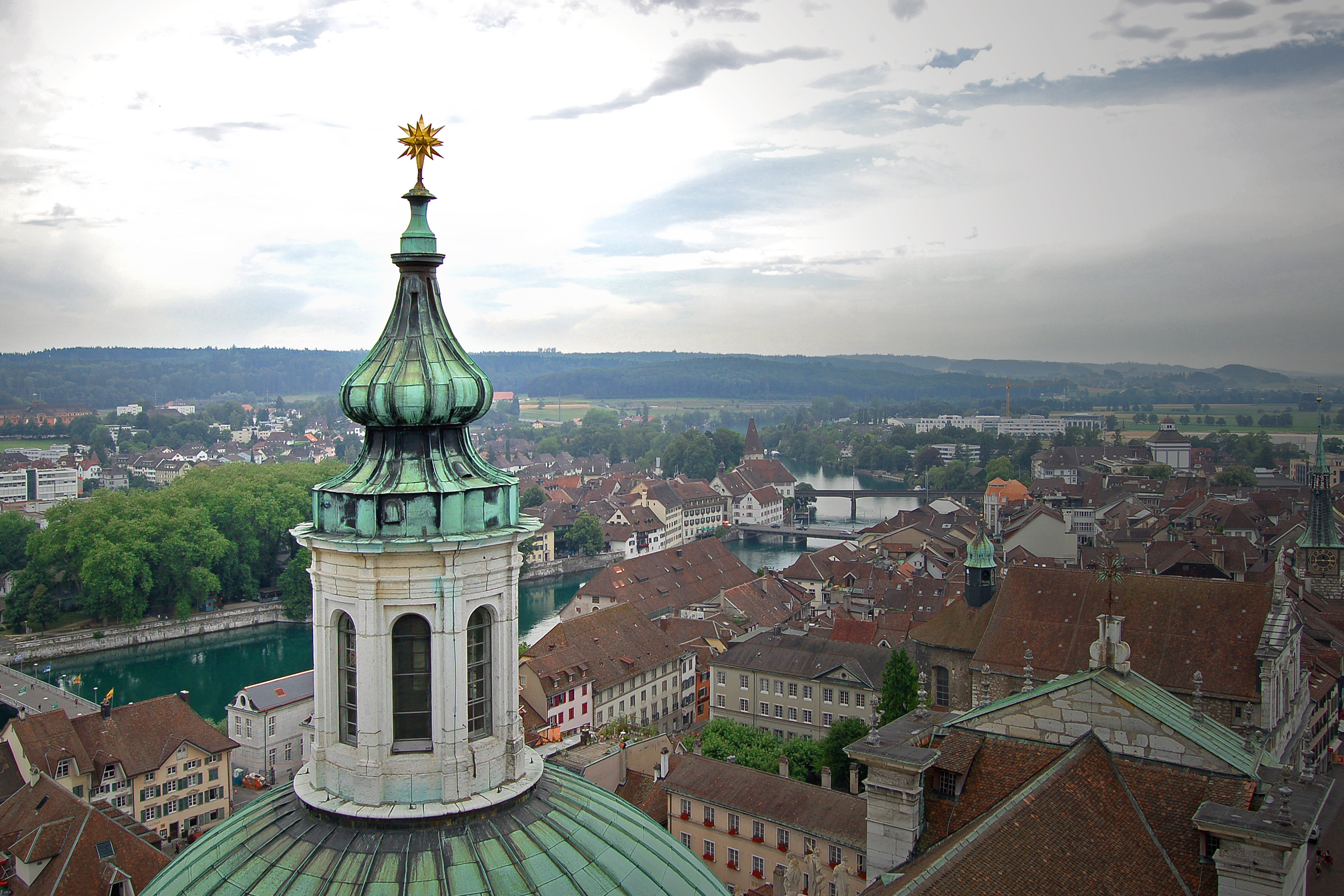
View from Solothurn toward Lüsslingen

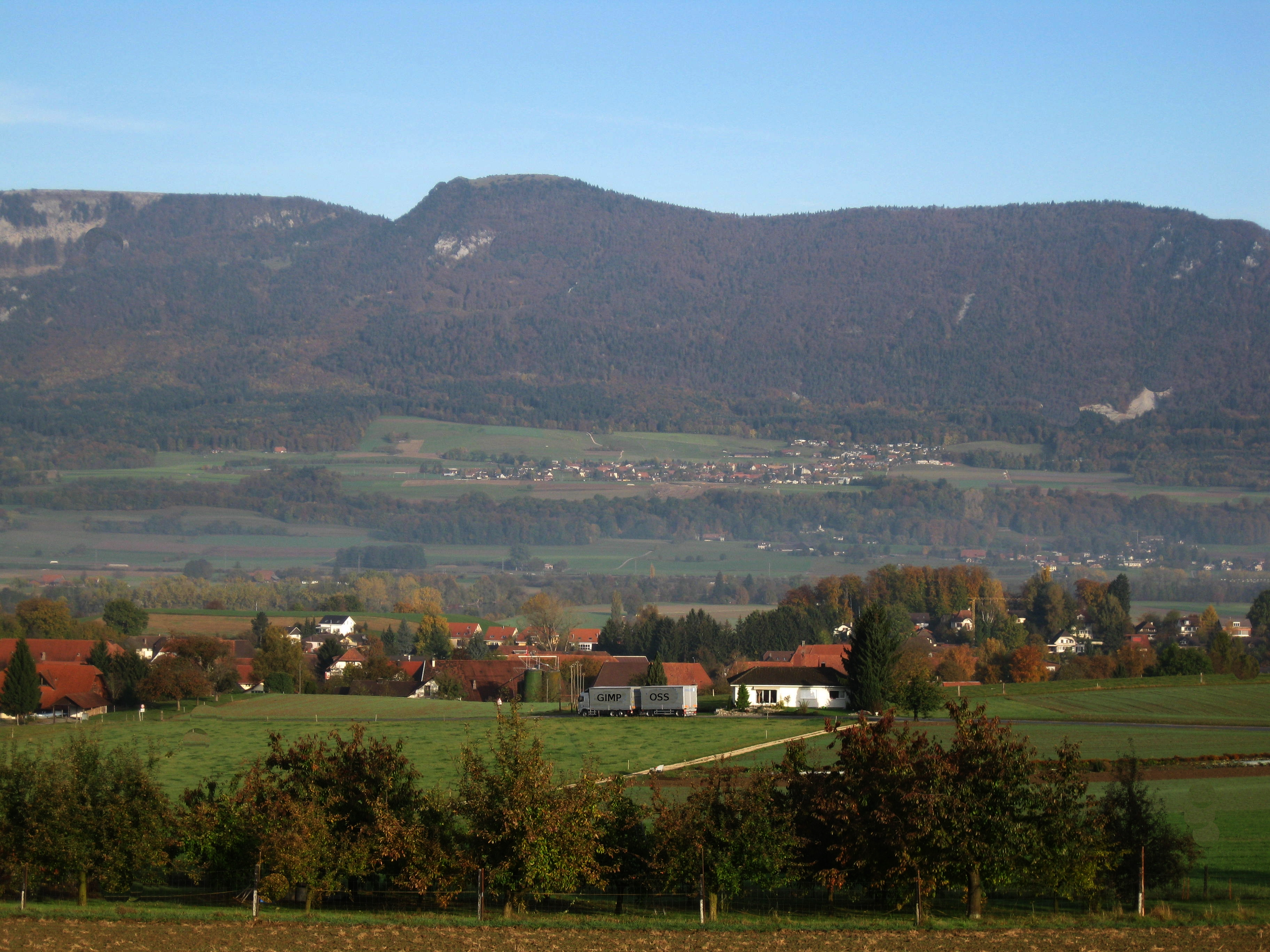
Nenningkofen village

Aerial view from 1000 m by Walter Mittelholzer (1923)

The former municipalities that make up Lüsslingen-Nennigkofen had an area of 7.81 km^{2} (3.02 sq mi).

Lüsslingen had an area, as of 2009, of 3.19 square kilometers (1.23 sq mi). Of this area, 1.76 km^{2} (0.68 sq mi) or 55.2% is used for agricultural purposes, while 0.85 km^{2} (0.33 sq mi) or 26.6% is forested. Of the rest of the land, 0.4 km^{2} (0.15 sq mi) or 12.5% is settled (buildings or roads), 0.2 km^{2} (0.077 sq mi) or 6.3% is either rivers or lakes and 0.01 km^{2} (2.5 acres) or 0.3% is unproductive land. The former municipality is located on the northern slope of Bucheggberg mountain. It is the closest municipality to Solothurn in the Bucheggberg district.

Nennigkofen had an area, as of 2009, of 4.62 square kilometers (1.78 sq mi). Of this area, 2.97 km^{2} (1.15 sq mi) or 64.3% is used for agricultural purposes, while 1.11 km^{2} (0.43 sq mi) or 24.0% is forested. Of the rest of the land, 0.36 km^{2} (0.14 sq mi) or 7.8% is settled (buildings or roads), 0.13 km^{2} (32 acres) or 2.8% is either rivers or lakes and 0.01 km^{2} (2.5 acres) or 0.2% is unproductive land. The former municipality is located in the Bucheggberger Aare valley.

=== Climate ===
Characterized by equable climates with few extremes of temperature and ample precipitation in all months. The Köppen Climate Classification subtype for this climate is "Cfb". (Marine West Coast Climate).

Climate data for Lüsslingen-Nennigkofen (1981-2010)
Month	Jan	Feb	Mar	Apr	May	Jun	Jul	Aug	Sep	Oct	Nov	Dec	Year
Mean daily maximum °C (°F)	2.7 (36.9)	4.8 (40.6)	10.0 (50.0)	14.1 (57.4)	18.9 (66.0)	22.4 (72.3)	24.9 (76.8)	24.2 (75.6)	19.7 (67.5)	14.3 (57.7)	7.3 (45.1)	3.5 (38.3)	13.9 (57.0)
Daily mean °C (°F)	−0.2 (31.6)	0.9 (33.6)	5.1 (41.2)	8.5 (47.3)	13.2 (55.8)	16.3 (61.3)	18.6 (65.5)	18.1 (64.6)	14.2 (57.6)	9.8 (49.6)	4.0 (39.2)	0.9 (33.6)	9.1 (48.4)
Mean daily minimum °C (°F)	−2.9 (26.8)	−2.7 (27.1)	0.7 (33.3)	3.4 (38.1)	8.0 (46.4)	11.2 (52.2)	13.2 (55.8)	12.9 (55.2)	9.8 (49.6)	6.2 (43.2)	1.2 (34.2)	−1.5 (29.3)	5.0 (41.0)
Average precipitation mm (inches)	71 (2.8)	64 (2.5)	75 (3.0)	77 (3.0)	110 (4.3)	114 (4.5)	105 (4.1)	120 (4.7)	97 (3.8)	90 (3.5)	77 (3.0)	89 (3.5)	1,088 (42.8)
Average snowfall cm (inches)	16 (6.3)	14.7 (5.8)	7.7 (3.0)	1.8 (0.7)	0 (0)	0 (0)	0 (0)	0 (0)	0 (0)	0.4 (0.2)	5.7 (2.2)	14.4 (5.7)	60.7 (23.9)
Average precipitation days (≥ 1.0 mm)	10.8	9.8	10.9	10.3	12.6	11.7	10.8	11.0	9.5	10.3	10.8	11.4	129.9
Average snowy days (≥ 1.0 cm)	4.7	4.2	2.6	0.7	0	0	0	0	0	0.1	1.5	3.4	17.2
Average relative humidity (%)	91.5	86.8	82.4	78.5	77.4	76.4	75.6	78.8	84.3	89.2	91.1	91.8	83.7
Source: MeteoSwiss

== Demographics ==
The total population of Lüsslingen-Nennigkofen (as of December 2020) is 1,101.

== Historic Population ==
The historical population is given in the following chart:
