= Adolf Kiefer =

Swiss mathematician (1857–1929)

Adolf Kiefer (22 June 1857 - 15 November 1929) was a Swiss mathematician, working mainly on geometry.

== Life ==
Kiefer was born in 1857 in Selzach, Switzerland to Jakob, a farmer, village mayor and member of Solothurn parliament. In 1880 he graduated as a teacher of mathematics and physics. He taught, from 1881-2, at the Concordia Institute, in Zürich. Kiefer's 1881 doctorate was from the University of Zürich for the thesis Der Kontakt höherer Ordnung bei algebraischen Flächen. Between 1882 and 1894 he taught geometry and technical drawing at the canton school in Frauenfeld, becoming deputy head in 1886 and head in 1888. In 1894 he became director of the Concordia Institute. Concordia closed after the First World War, and Kiefer taught elsewhere including Zurich teachers' college.

Kiefer was a member of the committee of the first International Congress of Mathematicians.

Kiefer retired in 1926 due to ill health. He became an honorary member of the Schweizerische Naturforschende Gesellschaft in 1928. He died 15 November 1929.

== Work ==
=== Books ===
- Ueber die geraden Kegel und Cylinder, welche durch gegebene Punkte des Raumes gehen oder gegebene gerade Linien des Raumes berühren (1888)

Kiefer published over thirty papers, mostly on geometry.

=== Papers ===
- Über Kräftezerlegung (1904)
- Über die Kettenlinie (1915)
- Von der Cykloide (1917)*
- Zum Normalenproblem bei den Flächen zweiten Grades(1921)
- Zwei spezielle Tetraeder (1925).
