= Lommiswil tracksite =

Dinosaur tracksite in Switzerland

Coordinates: 47°14′11″N 7°28′36″E

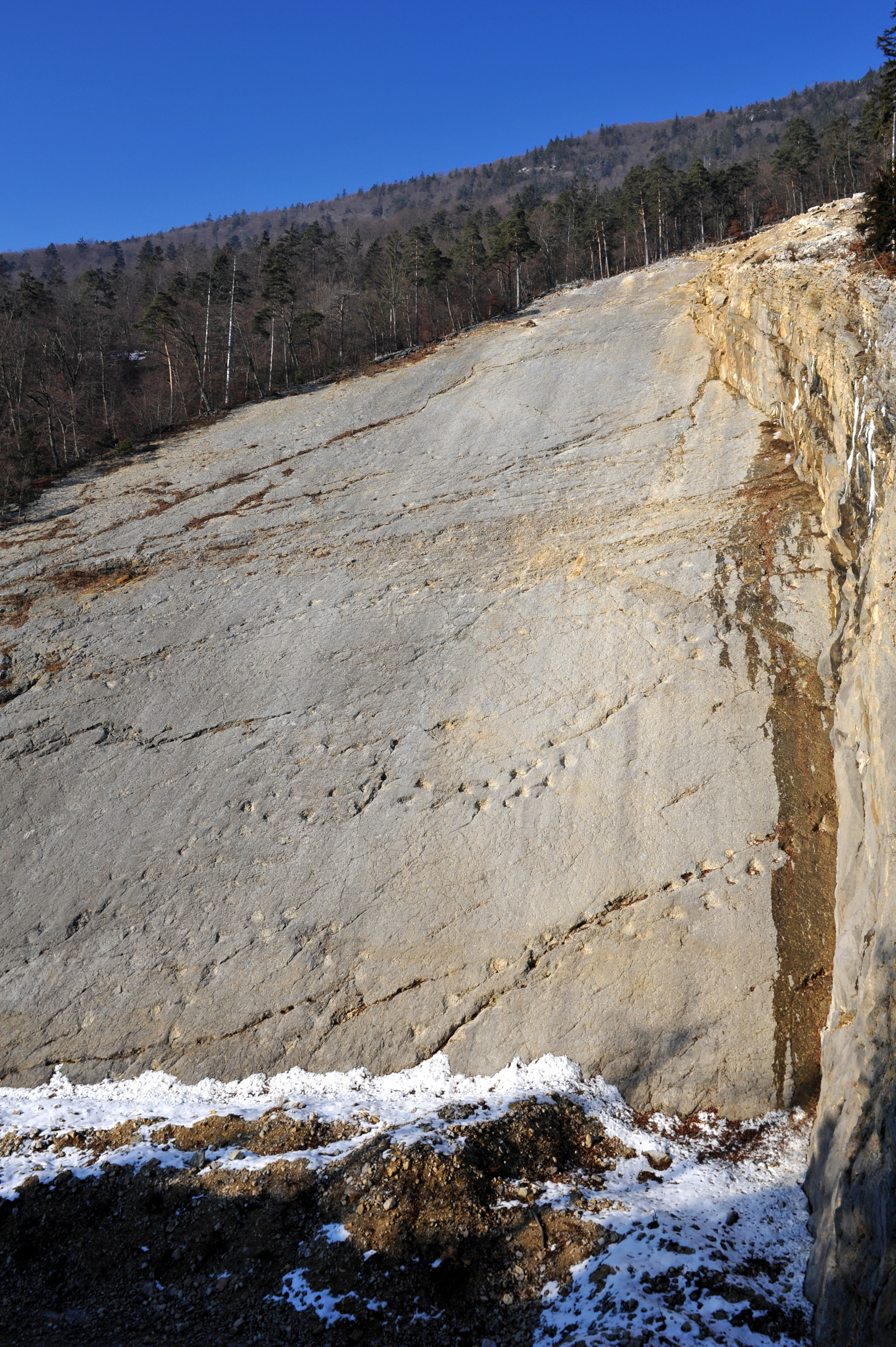
The Lommiswil sauropod tracks in low-angled light

The Lommiswil tracksite preserves fossil tracks of sauropod dinosaurs from the Late Jurassic epoch. The tracksite is located in the Jura Mountains in Switzerland, north of the village of Lommiswil and near the city of Solothurn, in limestones of the Reuchenette Formation. The site consists of around 450 individual tracks on a steeply inclined (70°) surface measuring 7,000 m^{2} (75,000 sq ft) in area. Discovered in 1988 in an active quarry, it was the first Jurassic dinosaur tracksite to be discovered in Switzerland. The tracks provided evidence that the area, which was thought to have been a shallow sea, was above sea level. The site was scientifically documented by rock climbing and the use of a helicopter. The tracks are large, with hind foot impressions up to 1 m (3 ft 3 in) in length. At least 10 trackways can be seen, one of which showing a pronounced right turn. The site is protected as a geoheritage site (geotope) and accessible to the public.

== Locality and discovery ==
The tracksite is located in the Steingrueben quarry, c. 1 km north of the village of Lommiswil, in the canton of Solothurn, Switzerland. Geologically, it is part of the Weissenstein anticline, a major fold in the southernmost extent of the Swiss Jura Mountains. The sediments are part of the Reuchenette Formation and date to the late Kimmeridgian. The track surface is inclined by about 70°. The Steingrueben quarry extracted packstones that contained a large amount of snail shells (Nerineidae) for use as building stones. The tracks were located directly beneath this packstone layer and were exposed as the stone was quarried away. Besides the abundant snail shells, macroscopic fossils are rare in the quarry, but the hermit crab Orhomalus virgulinus, a tooth of the fish Macrodon, fragments of turtle shells (Plesiochelys), tooth plates of sharks (Asteracanthus), and fragments of the marine crocodile Steneosaurus have been discovered.

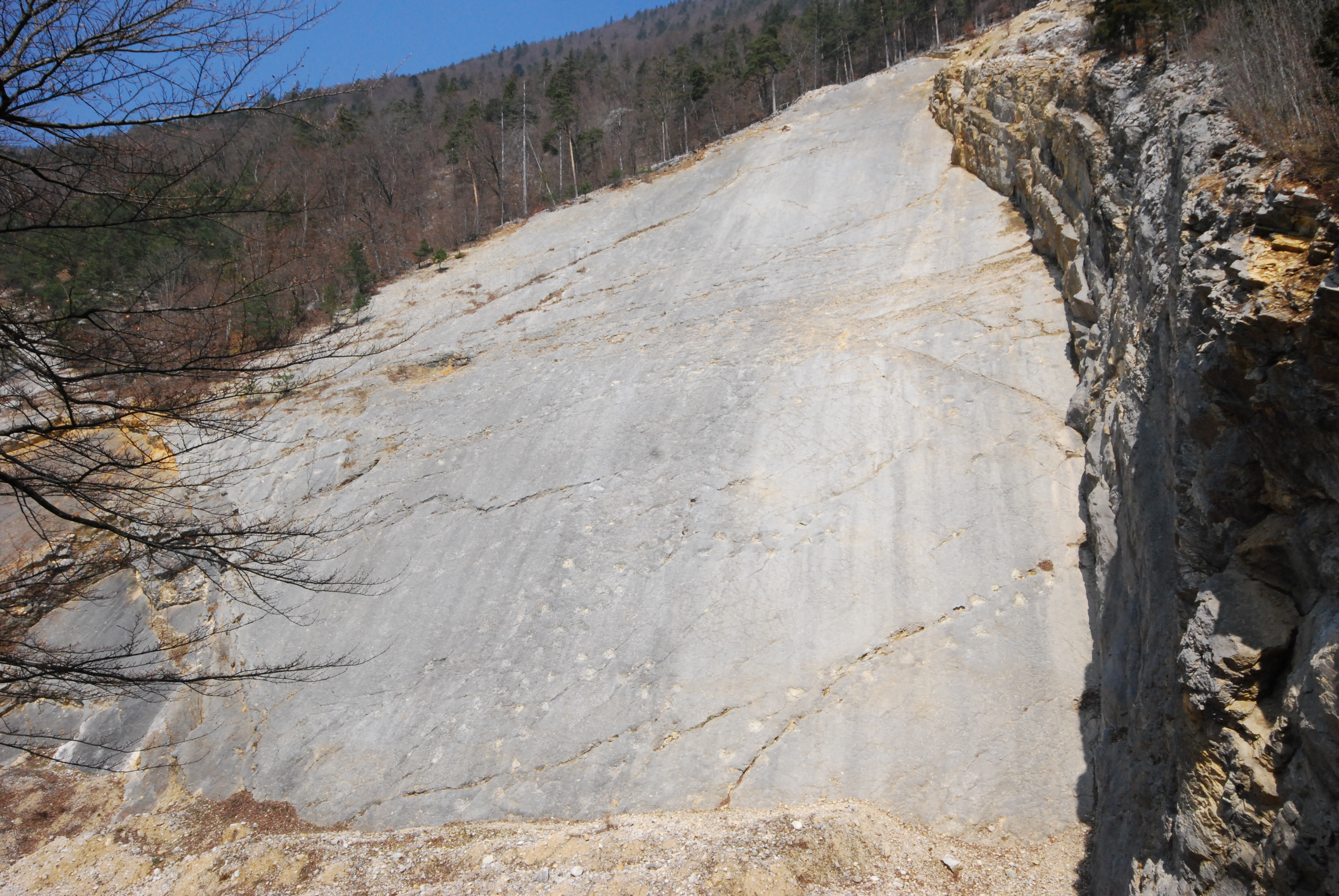
The tracksite at noon

The tracks were discovered by the palaeontologist Christian Meyer in February 1988, having previously been overlooked by geologists who studied the quarry. They were the first discovered dinosaur tracks from the Late Jurassic of Switzerland. The scientific study was complicated by the steep inclination of the surface and the danger of rock fall. To allow every individual track to be reached by climbing, the entire surface was equipped with bolts. In order to produce a sitemap, the track outlines were traced with black paint and photographed perpendicular to the surface from a helicopter. Artificial casts of selected tracks were made in 1988 and 1990, and stored in the Museum of Nature in Solothurn.

Meyer published a preliminary report in 1990, which noted more than 200 individual tracks, and an additional account in 1993, in which more than 380 tracks were recognised. In 2003, Meyer and Basil Thüring reported that 450 tracks are visible, with new tracks being exposed due to continued quarrying. The site has been protected as a geoheritage site (geotope), and was the first designated geotope of Switzerland. An observation platform with interpretive signs was installed to make the site accessible to visitors.

== Palaeoenvironment and palaeobiogeography ==
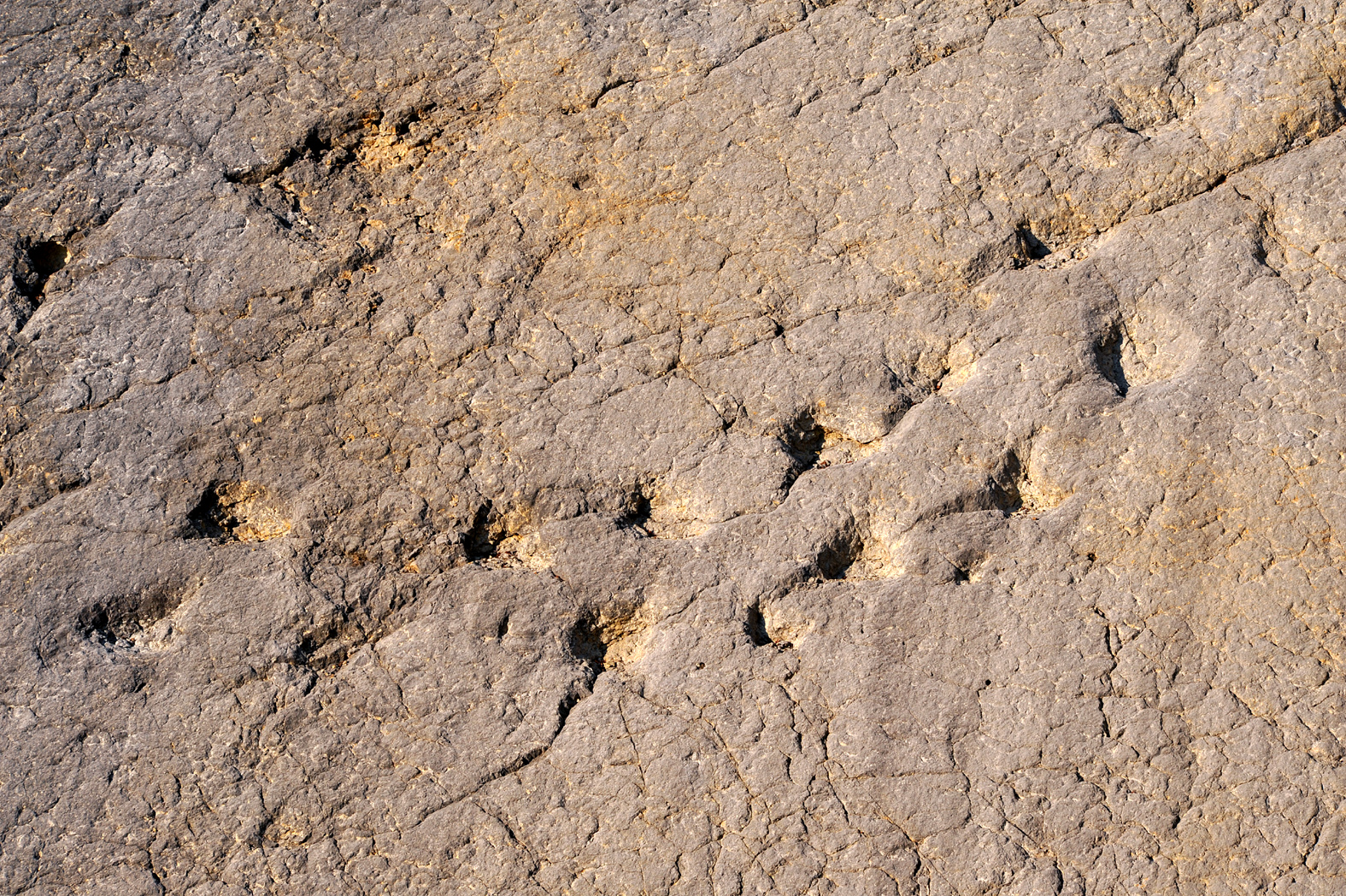
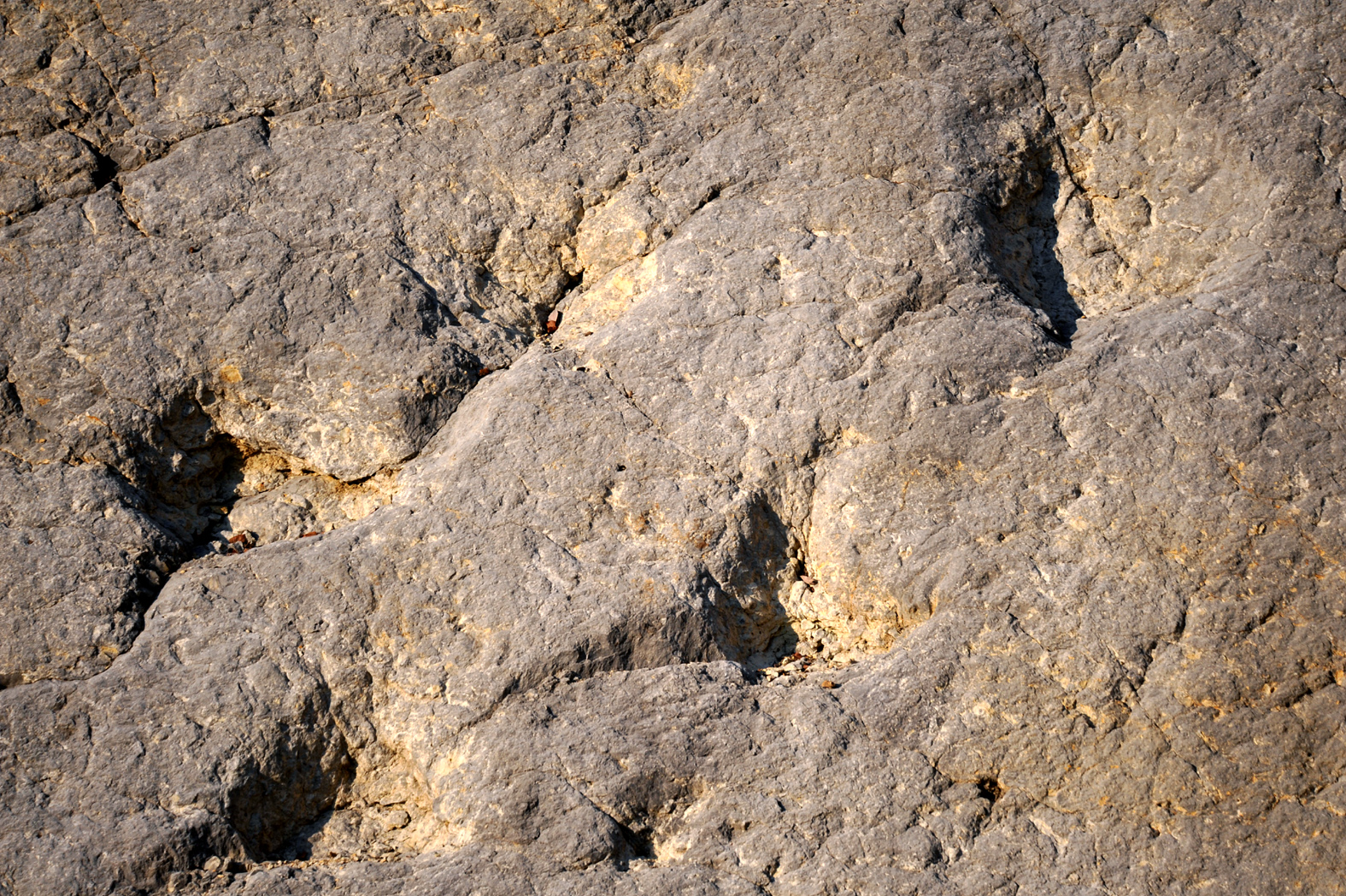
The clearest trackway, describing a right turn. Both hind and forefoot impressions are preserved. The sauropod was walking from right to left.

The tracks were preserved in wackestones that formed in the intertidal zone of a carbonate platform. As the sediments are marine, the tracks provided definitive evidence that the area was above water level at the time the tracks were formed. In his 1990 description, Meyer concluded that much of the western part of what later became the Swiss Jura mountains have been emergent, as otherwise the dinosaurs could not have reached the area. In 1993, Meyer observed that the sediments above the track level record a marine transgression (sea level rise), and that the tracks were formed at a time when the sea level was relatively low. The eastern part of the tracksite shows mudcracks and, within the tracks, Thalassinoides burrows. At the time of track formation, the eastern part of the tracksite was probably emerged while the western part was submerged.

In 1989, Meyer discovered an additional tracksite near Grenchen about 5 km (3.1 mi) from the Lommiswil tracksite that contained similar sauropod tracks. By 1993, a total of six sites were known in the area, which could all be correlated to the same layer within the Reuchenette Formation. Therefore, Meyer suggested that these sites together form a megatracksite (a large-scale but discontinuous tracksite).

== Description and interpretation ==
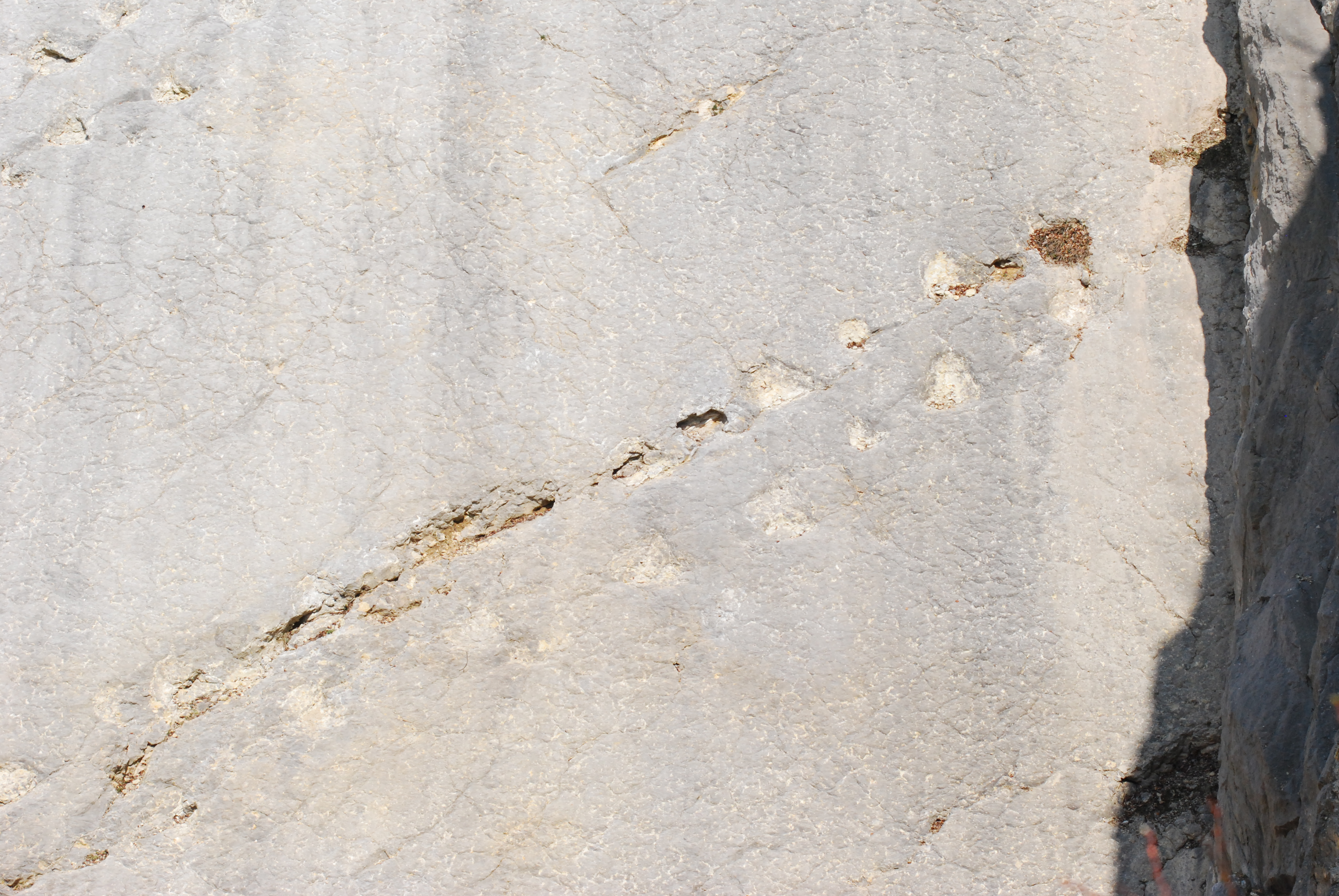
Trackway in the lower-right corner of the surface (sauropod walking from right to left)

The Lommiswil tracksite covers a surface of 7,000 m^{2} (75,000 sq ft) and contains at least 10 identifiable trackways, one of them measuring 90 m (300 ft) in length. The tracks are preserved as moulds (concave impressions) and are 10–25 cm (3.9–9.8 in) deep. The tracks are relatively large; the pes (hind foot) tracks are triangular in shape and up to 1 m (3 ft 3 in) in diameter. The manus (fore foot) tracks are often overprinted by the pes, but where they are preserved, they are crescent-shaped and much smaller, measuring about 40 cm (16 in) in both length and width. The stride length (the distance between two tracks made by the same foot) is 220 to 250 cm (87 to 98 in). In general, the tracks lack anatomical details such as claw impressions. Sometimes, the pes tracks are only partly impressed, forming a horseshoe-like shape.

The trackways are wide-gauged (the pes tracks do not overlap the trackway midline). The clearest trackway shows a right turn of about 57°. Despite the variability of their shape, Meyer suggested that all tracks were probably made by a single species of sauropod.
