= Nennigkofen =

- Former municipality
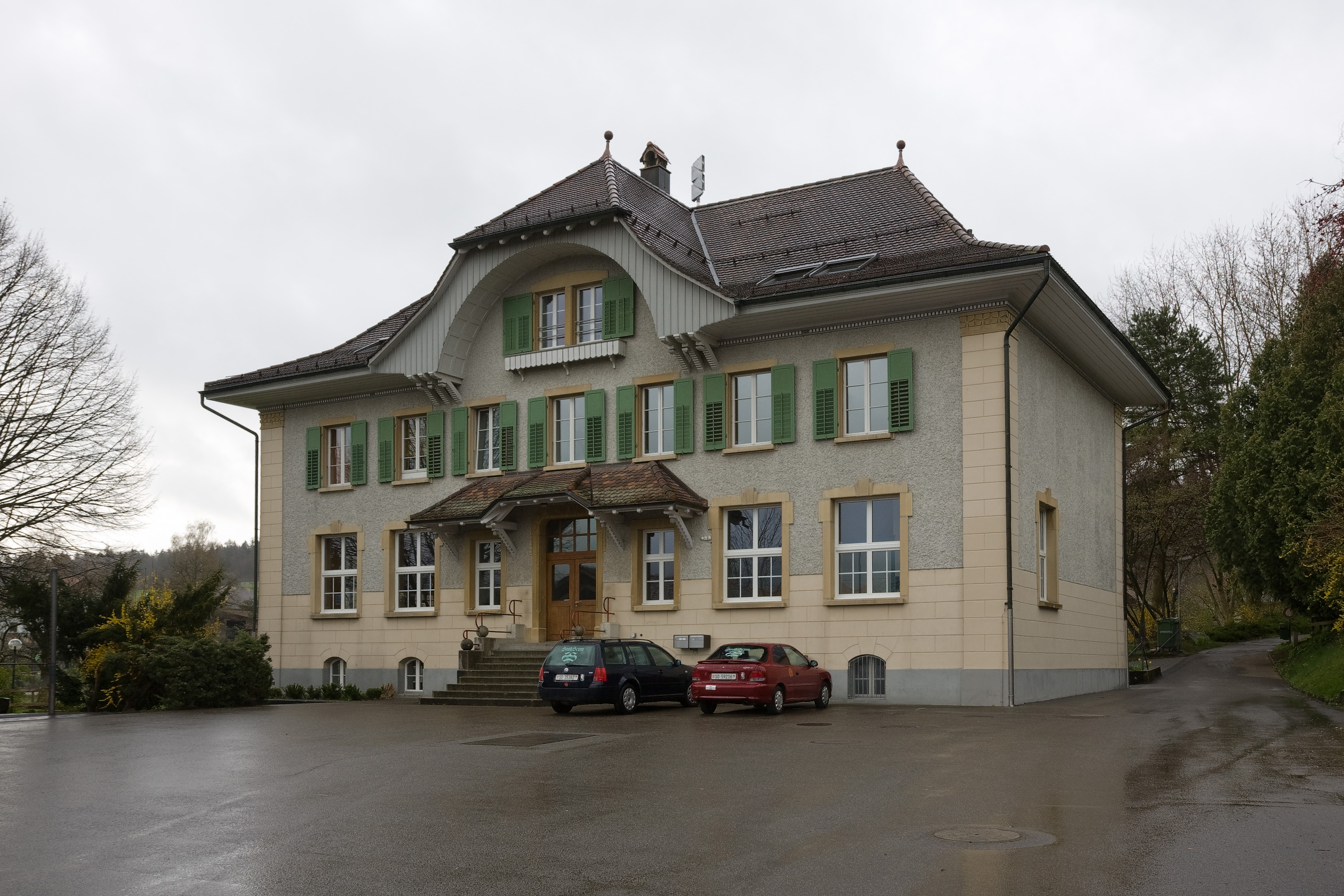
- Nennigkofen school house

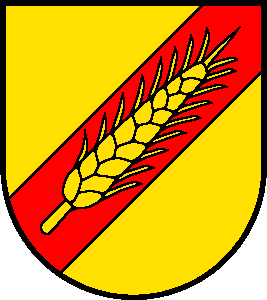
- Coat of arms
- Location of Nennigkofen
- Location within Switzerland Location within Canton of Solothurn
- Coordinates: 47°11′N 7°30′E
- Country: Switzerland
- Canton: Solothurn
- District: Bucheggberg

Area
  - Total: 4.62 km^{2} (1.78 sq mi)
- Elevation: 456 m (1,496 ft)

Population (Dec 2011)
  - Total: 484
  - Density: 105/km^{2} (271/sq mi)
- Time zone: UTC+01:00 (CET)
  - Summer (DST): UTC+02:00 (CEST)
- Postal code: 4574
- SFOS number: 2459
- ISO 3166 code: CH-SO
- Surrounded by: Leuzigen (BE), Lüterkofen-Ichertswil, Selzach
- Website: SFSO statistics

Nennigkofen is a former municipality in the district of Bucheggberg, in the canton of Solothurn, Switzerland. On 1 January 2013, Lüsslingen and Nennigkofen merged to form Lüsslingen-Nennigkofen.

== History ==
Nennigkofen is first mentioned in 1392 as Nennikofen or Nennikoven.

== Geography ==
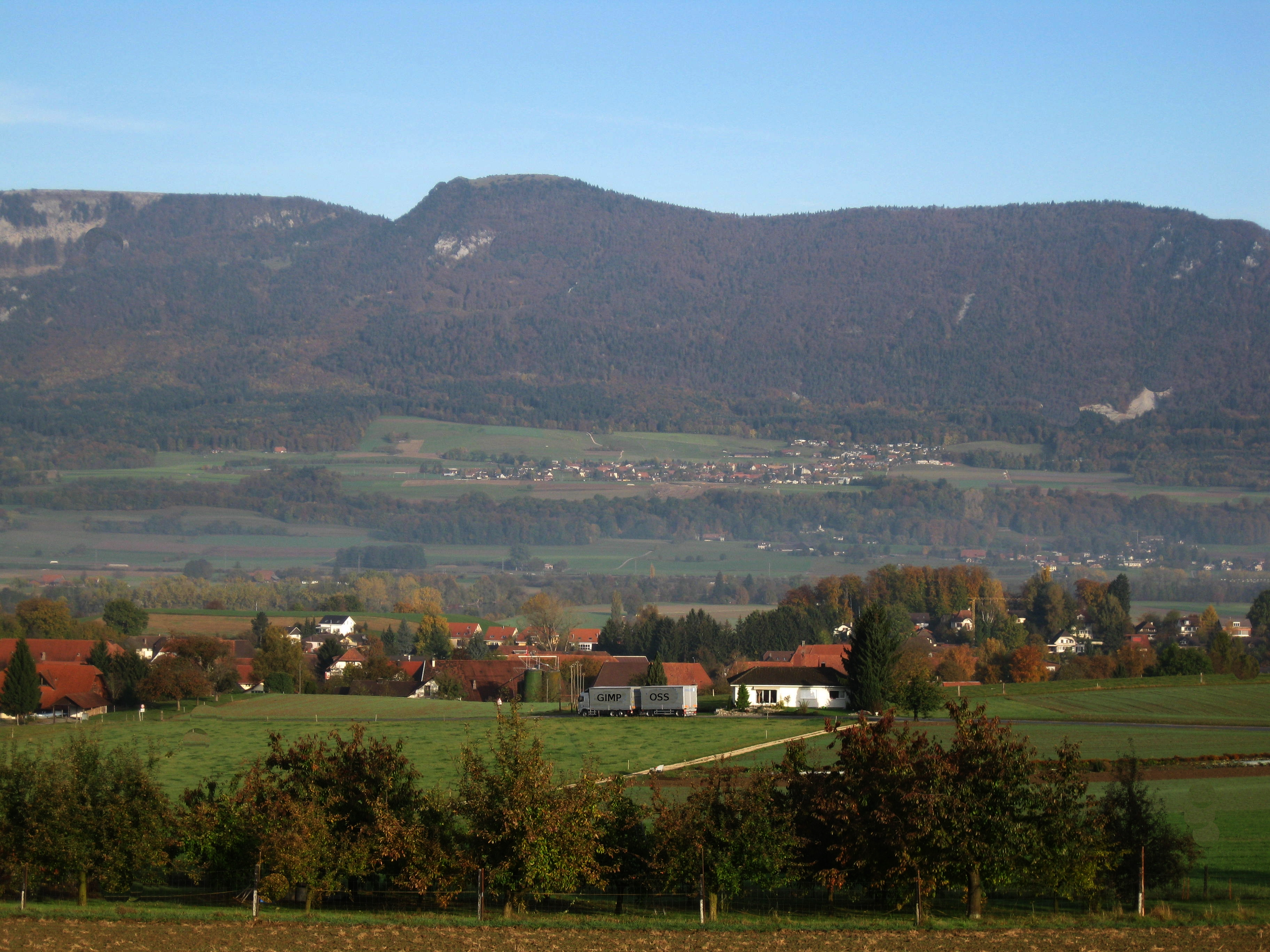
Nenningkofen village

Aerial view (1970)

Nennigkofen had an area, as of 2009, of 4.62 square kilometers (1.78 sq mi). Of this area, 2.97 km^{2} (1.15 sq mi) or 64.3% is used for agricultural purposes, while 1.11 km^{2} (0.43 sq mi) or 24.0% is forested. Of the rest of the land, 0.36 km^{2} (0.14 sq mi) or 7.8% is settled (buildings or roads), 0.13 km^{2} (32 acres) or 2.8% is either rivers or lakes and 0.01 km^{2} (2.5 acres) or 0.2% is unproductive land.

Of the built up area, housing and buildings made up 4.1% and transportation infrastructure made up 3.0%. Out of the forested land, 22.3% of the total land area is heavily forested and 1.7% is covered with orchards or small clusters of trees. Of the agricultural land, 46.3% is used for growing crops and 16.2% is pastures, while 1.7% is used for orchards or vine crops. All the water in the municipality is flowing water.

The former municipality is located in the Bucheggberg district. Nennigkofen and the neighboring municipality of Lüsslingen form the Bucheggberger Aare valley.

== Coat of arms ==
The blazon of the municipal coat of arms is Or an Ear of the same on a Bend sinister Gules.

== Demographics ==
Nennigkofen had a population (as of 2011) of 484. As of 2008, 9.1% of the population are resident foreign nationals. Over the last 10 years (1999–2009) the population has changed at a rate of 3.9%.

Most of the population (as of 2000) speaks German (465 or 96.9%), with French being second most common (5 or 1.0%) and Italian being third (1 or 0.2%). There is 1 person who speaks Romansh.

As of 2008, the gender distribution of the population was 49.5% male and 50.5% female. The population was made up of 229 Swiss men (45.2% of the population) and 22 (4.3%) non-Swiss men. There were 231 Swiss women (45.6%) and 25 (4.9%) non-Swiss women. Of the population in the municipality 206 or about 42.9% were born in Nennigkofen and lived there in 2000. There were 131 or 27.3% who were born in the same canton, while 96 or 20.0% were born somewhere else in Switzerland, and 37 or 7.7% were born outside of Switzerland.

In 2008 there were 2 live births to Swiss citizens and 3 births to non-Swiss citizens, and in same time span there were 4 deaths of Swiss citizens. Ignoring immigration and emigration, the population of Swiss citizens decreased by 2 while the foreign population increased by 3. There were 3 non-Swiss men and 1 non-Swiss woman who immigrated from another country to Switzerland. The total Swiss population remained the same in 2008 and the non-Swiss population increased by 5 people. This represents a population growth rate of 1.0%.

The age distribution, as of 2000, in Nennigkofen is; 42 children or 8.8% of the population are between 0 and 6 years old and 93 teenagers or 19.4% are between 7 and 19. Of the adult population, 21 people or 4.4% of the population are between 20 and 24 years old. 130 people or 27.1% are between 25 and 44, and 118 people or 24.6% are between 45 and 64. The senior population distribution is 60 people or 12.5% of the population are between 65 and 79 years old and there are 16 people or 3.3% who are over 80.

As of 2000, there were 204 people who were single and never married in the municipality. There were 234 married individuals, 25 widows or widowers and 17 individuals who are divorced.

As of 2000, there were 182 private households in the municipality, and an average of 2.6 persons per household. There were 50 households that consist of only one person and 20 households with five or more people. Out of a total of 186 households that answered this question, 26.9% were households made up of just one person and there were 2 adults who lived with their parents. Of the rest of the households, there are 47 married couples without children, 74 married couples with children There were 7 single parents with a child or children. There were 2 households that were made up of unrelated people and 4 households that were made up of some sort of institution or another collective housing.

In 2000 there were 99 single family homes (or 66.0% of the total) out of a total of 150 inhabited buildings. There were 16 multi-family buildings (10.7%), along with 27 multi-purpose buildings that were mostly used for housing (18.0%) and 8 other use buildings (commercial or industrial) that also had some housing (5.3%). Of the single family homes 15 were built before 1919, while 12 were built between 1990 and 2000. The greatest number of single family homes (20) were built between 1946 and 1960.

In 2000 there were 184 apartments in the municipality. The most common apartment size was 5 rooms of which there were 45. There were 2 single room apartments and 104 apartments with five or more rooms. Of these apartments, a total of 173 apartments (94.0% of the total) were permanently occupied, while 7 apartments (3.8%) were seasonally occupied and 4 apartments (2.2%) were empty. As of 2009, the construction rate of new housing units was 0 new units per 1000 residents. The vacancy rate for the municipality, in 2010, was 1.04%.

The historical population is given in the following chart:

== Politics ==
In the 2007 federal election the most popular party was the FDP which received 29.7% of the vote. The next three most popular parties were the SP (28.7%), the Green Party (17.59%) and the SVP (14.78%). In the federal election, a total of 220 votes were cast, and the voter turnout was 59.6%.

== Economy ==
As of 2010, Nennigkofen had an unemployment rate of 2.9%. As of 2008, there were 45 people employed in the primary economic sector and about 16 businesses involved in this sector. 68 people were employed in the secondary sector and there were 5 businesses in this sector. 42 people were employed in the tertiary sector, with 15 businesses in this sector. There were 252 residents of the municipality who were employed in some capacity, of which females made up 40.9% of the workforce.

In 2008 the total number of full-time equivalent jobs was 115. The number of jobs in the primary sector was 28, of which 27 were in agriculture and 1 was in forestry or lumber production. The number of jobs in the secondary sector was 58 of which 46 or (79.3%) were in manufacturing and 12 (20.7%) were in construction. The number of jobs in the tertiary sector was 29. In the tertiary sector; 3 or 10.3% were in wholesale or retail sales or the repair of motor vehicles, 2 or 6.9% were in the movement and storage of goods, 10 or 34.5% were in a hotel or restaurant, 4 or 13.8% were technical professionals or scientists, 2 or 6.9% were in education and 2 or 6.9% were in health care.

In 2000, there were 73 workers who commuted into the municipality and 171 workers who commuted away. The municipality is a net exporter of workers, with about 2.3 workers leaving the municipality for every one entering. Of the working population, 9.9% used public transportation to get to work, and 50% used a private car.

== Religion ==
From the 2000 census, 70 or 14.6% were Roman Catholic, while 309 or 64.4% belonged to the Swiss Reformed Church. Of the rest of the population, there were 6 individuals (or about 1.25% of the population) who belonged to the Christian Catholic Church, and there was 1 individual who belongs to another Christian church. There was 1 individual who was Islamic. There were 5 individuals who were Buddhist. 78 (or about 16.25% of the population) belonged to no church, are agnostic or atheist, and 10 individuals (or about 2.08% of the population) did not answer the question.

== Education ==
In Nennigkofen about 190 or (39.6%) of the population have completed non-mandatory upper secondary education, and 70 or (14.6%) have completed additional higher education (either university or a Fachhochschule). Of the 70 who completed tertiary schooling, 72.9% were Swiss men, 21.4% were Swiss women.

As of 2000, there were 18 students in Nennigkofen who came from another municipality, while 59 residents attended schools outside the municipality.
