= Bellacher Weiher =

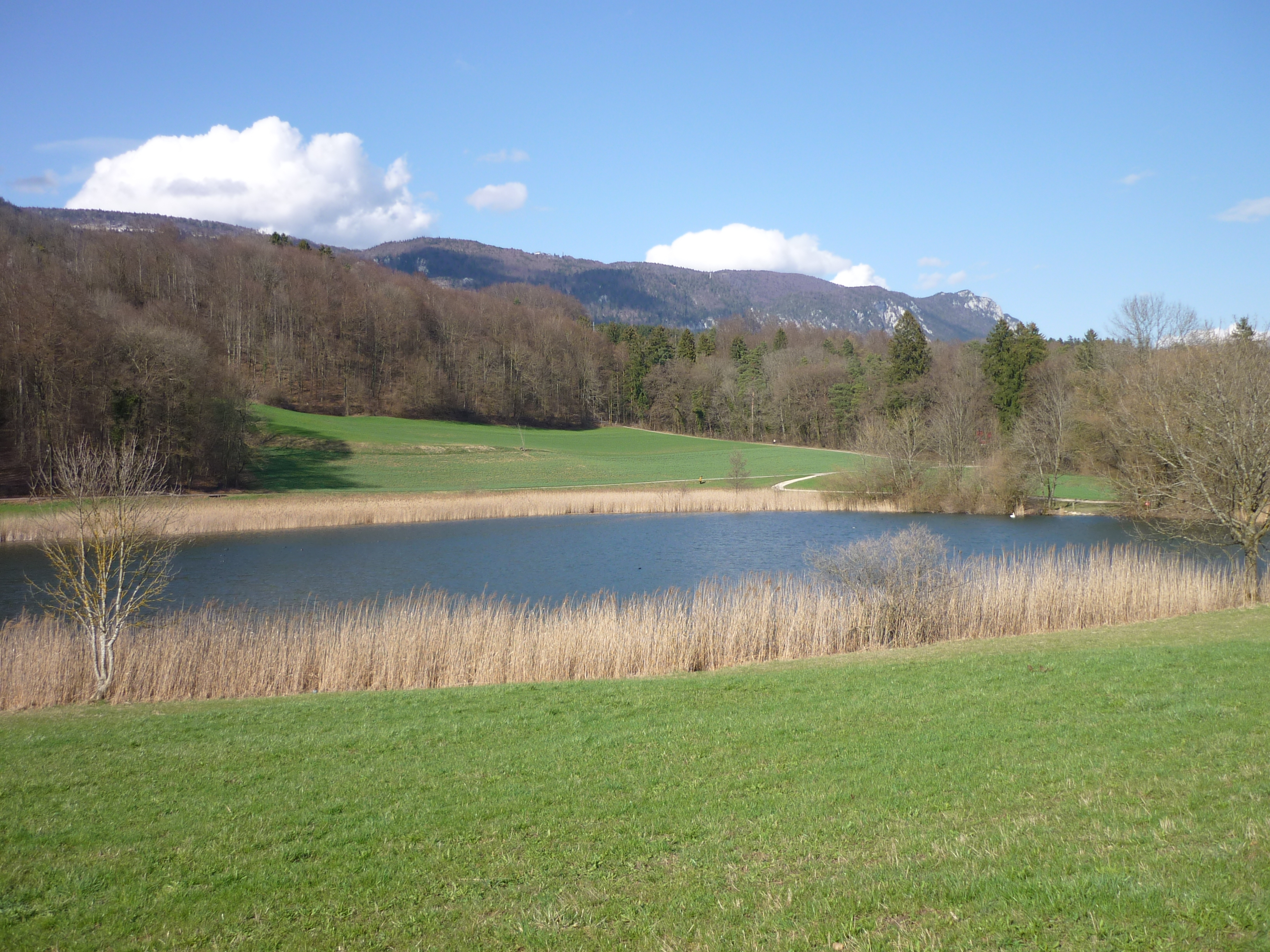

- Location within Canton of Solothurn Location within Switzerland Location within Alps
- Interactive map of Bellacher Weiher
- Location: Bellach, Canton of Solothurn
- Coordinates: 47°12′50″N 7°28′51″E
- Type: reservoir
- Basin countries: Switzerland
- Surface area: 3.3 ha (8.2 acres)
- Max. depth: 2 m (6 ft 7 in)

Bellacher Weiher (also spelt Bellacherweiher, Bellacher-Weiher, or Weier) is a small lake at Bellach in the Canton of Solothurn, Switzerland. Its surface area is 3.3 ha. The pond was formed in 1548. Lake and surroundings are a nature preserve.
