= Lüsslingen =

- Former municipality
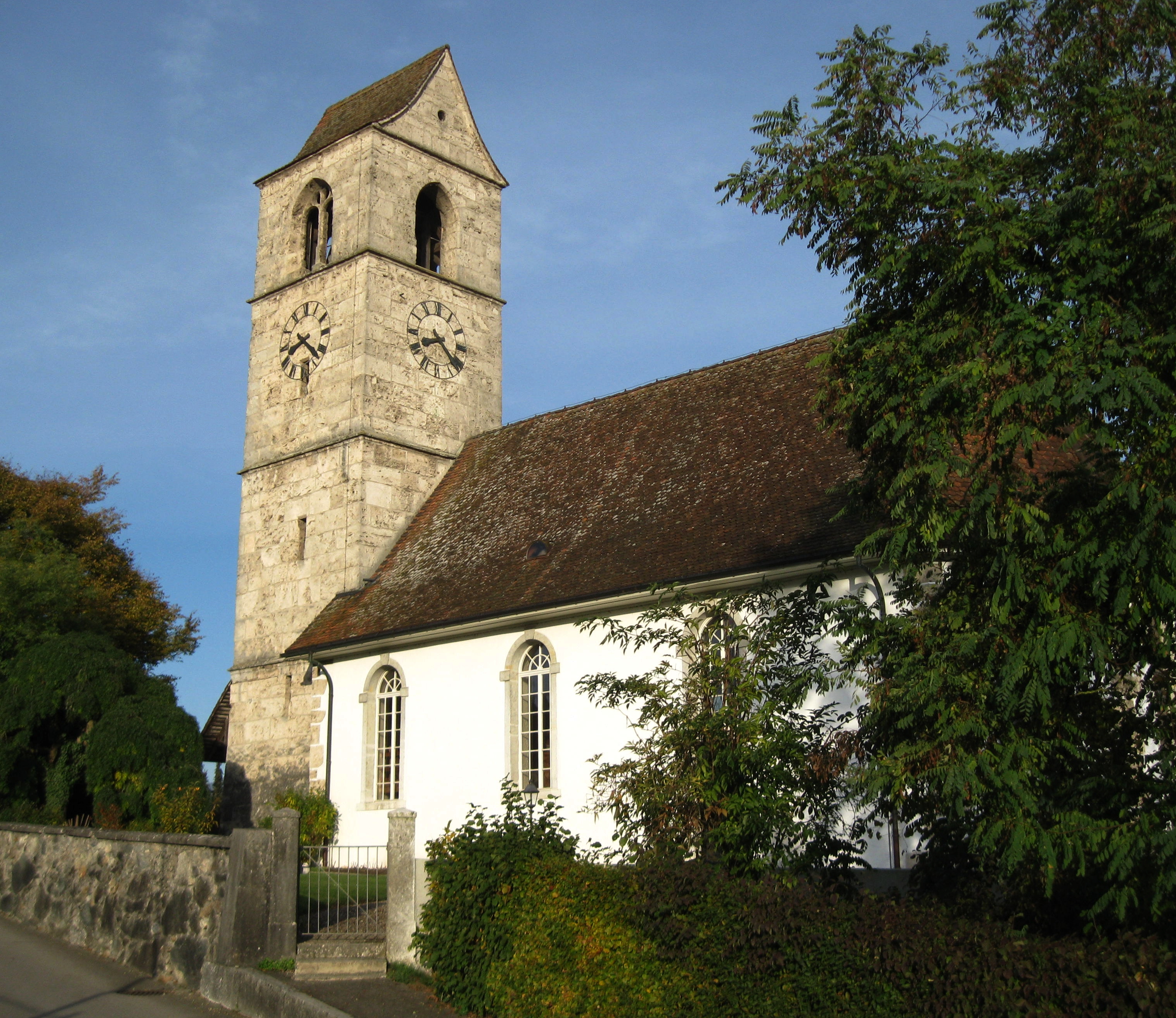
- Lüsslingen village church

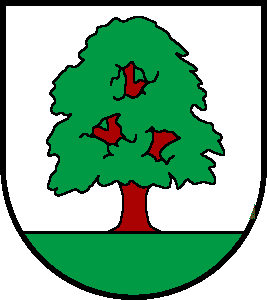
- Coat of arms
- Location of Lüsslingen
- Location within Switzerland Location within Canton of Solothurn
- Coordinates: 47°11′N 7°30′E
- Country: Switzerland
- Canton: Solothurn
- District: Bucheggberg

Area
  - Total: 3.19 km^{2} (1.23 sq mi)
- Elevation: 439 m (1,440 ft)

Population (December 2020)
  - Total: 522
  - Density: 164/km^{2} (424/sq mi)
- Time zone: UTC+01:00 (CET)
  - Summer (DST): UTC+02:00 (CEST)
- Postal code: 4574
- SFOS number: 2454
- ISO 3166 code: CH-SO
- Surrounded by: Bellach, Biberist, Lohn-Ammannsegg, Lüterkofen-Ichertswil, Nennigkofen, Selzach
- Website: www.luesslingen.ch

Lüsslingen is a former municipality in the district of Bucheggberg, in the canton of Solothurn, Switzerland. On 1 January 2013, Lüsslingen and Nennigkofen merged to form Lüsslingen-Nennigkofen.

== History ==
Lüsslingen is first mentioned in 1251 as in Luslingen.

== Geography ==
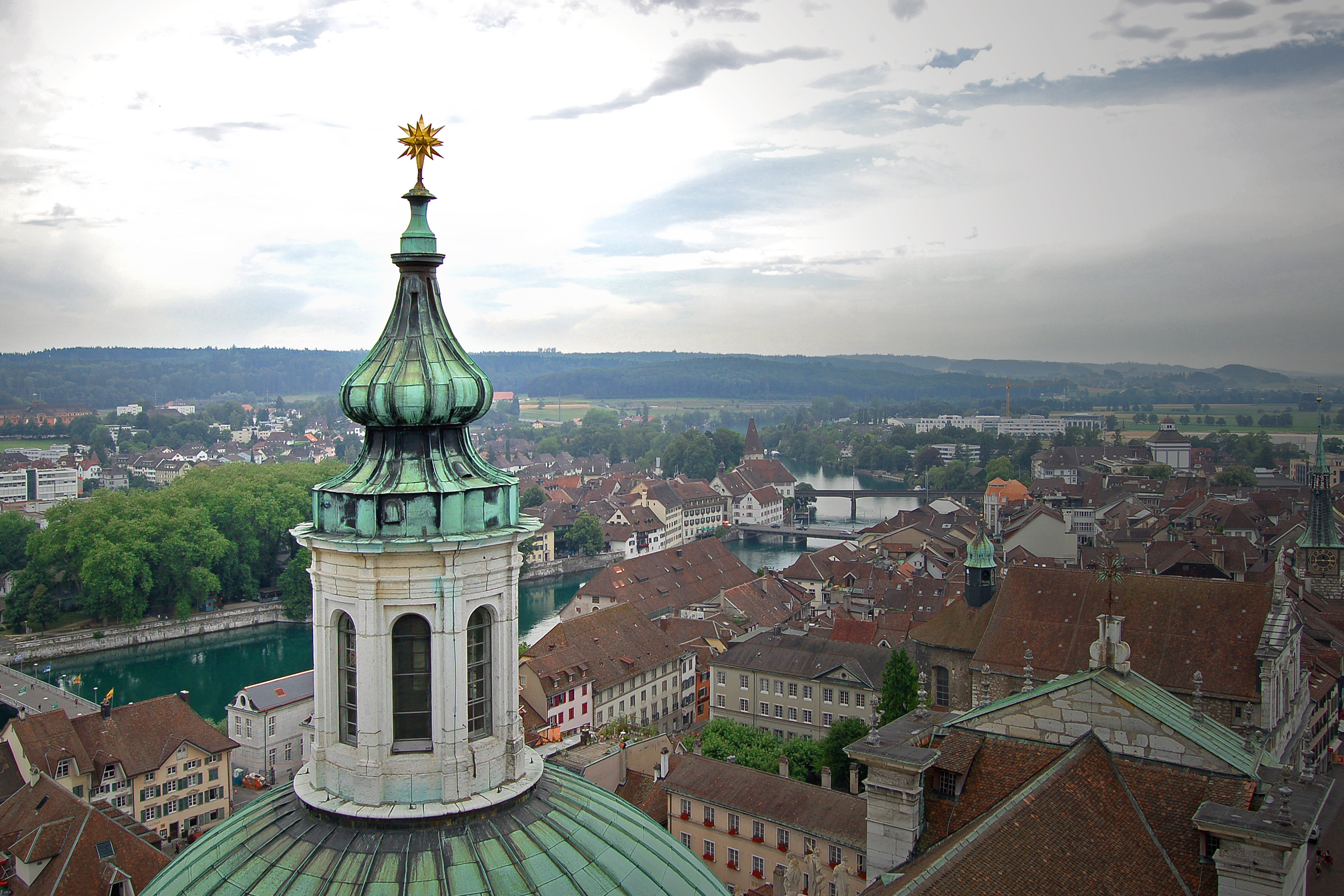
View from Solothurn toward Lüsslingen

Aerial view from 1000 m by Walter Mittelholzer (1923)

Lüsslingen had an area, as of 2009, of 3.19 square kilometers (1.23 sq mi). Of this area, 1.76 km^{2} (0.68 sq mi) or 55.2% is used for agricultural purposes, while 0.85 km^{2} (0.33 sq mi) or 26.6% is forested. Of the rest of the land, 0.4 km^{2} (0.15 sq mi) or 12.5% is settled (buildings or roads), 0.2 km^{2} (0.077 sq mi) or 6.3% is either rivers or lakes and 0.01 km^{2} (2.5 acres) or 0.3% is unproductive land.

Of the built up area, industrial buildings made up 3.1% of the total area while housing and buildings made up 3.4% and transportation infrastructure made up 4.7%. Out of the forested land, 24.1% of the total land area is heavily forested and 2.5% is covered with orchards or small clusters of trees. Of the agricultural land, 40.4% is used for growing crops and 13.5% is pastures, while 1.3% is used for orchards or vine crops. All the water in the municipality is flowing water.

The former municipality is located in the Bucheggberg district, on the northern slope of Bucheggberg mountain. It is the closest municipality to Solothurn in the Bucheggberg district.

== Coat of arms ==
The blazon of the municipal coat of arms is Argent a Linden Tree proper issuant from a Base Vert.

== Demographics ==
Lüsslingen had a population (as of 2011) of 514. As of 2008, 13.4% of the population are resident foreign nationals. Over the last 10 years (1999–2009 ) the population has changed at a rate of 16.6%.

Most of the population (as of 2000) speaks German (420 or 94.4%), with Albanian being second most common (7 or 1.6%) and Arabian being third (5 or 1.1%). There are 3 people who speak French.

As of 2008, the gender distribution of the population was 49.4% male and 50.6% female. The population was made up of 221 Swiss men (42.7% of the population) and 35 (6.8%) non-Swiss men. There were 220 Swiss women (42.5%) and 42 (8.1%) non-Swiss women. Of the population in the municipality 126 or about 28.3% were born in Lüsslingen and lived there in 2000. There were 133 or 29.9% who were born in the same canton, while 125 or 28.1% were born somewhere else in Switzerland, and 42 or 9.4% were born outside of Switzerland.

In 2008 there were 4 live births to Swiss citizens and 1 birth to non-Swiss citizens, and in same time span there were 4 deaths of Swiss citizens. Ignoring immigration and emigration, the population of Swiss citizens remained the same while the foreign population increased by 1. There was 1 Swiss woman who immigrated back to Switzerland. At the same time, there was 1 non-Swiss man who emigrated from Switzerland to another country and 4 non-Swiss women who immigrated from another country to Switzerland. The total Swiss population change in 2008 (from all sources, including moves across municipal borders) was an increase of 1 and the non-Swiss population remained the same. This represents a population growth rate of 0.2%.

The age distribution, as of 2000, in Lüsslingen is; 25 children or 5.6% of the population are between 0 and 6 years old and 73 teenagers or 16.4% are between 7 and 19. Of the adult population, 14 people or 3.1% of the population are between 20 and 24 years old. 136 people or 30.6% are between 25 and 44, and 105 people or 23.6% are between 45 and 64. The senior population distribution is 68 people or 15.3% of the population are between 65 and 79 years old and there are 24 people or 5.4% who are over 80.

As of 2000, there were 172 people who were single and never married in the municipality. There were 216 married individuals, 38 widows or widowers and 19 individuals who are divorced.

As of 2000, there were 189 private households in the municipality, and an average of 2.3 persons per household. There were 55 households that consist of only one person and 12 households with five or more people. Out of a total of 193 households that answered this question, 28.5% were households made up of just one person and there were 1 adults who lived with their parents. Of the rest of the households, there are 61 married couples without children, 54 married couples with children There were 12 single parents with a child or children. There were 6 households that were made up of unrelated people and 4 households that were made up of some sort of institution or another collective housing.

In 2000 there were 84 single family homes (or 60.0% of the total) out of a total of 140 inhabited buildings. There were 24 multi-family buildings (17.1%), along with 24 multi-purpose buildings that were mostly used for housing (17.1%) and 8 other use buildings (commercial or industrial) that also had some housing (5.7%). Of the single family homes 16 were built before 1919, while 10 were built between 1990 and 2000. The greatest number of single family homes (26) were built between 1946 and 1960.

In 2000 there were 207 apartments in the municipality. The most common apartment size was 4 rooms of which there were 69. There were 4 single room apartments and 70 apartments with five or more rooms. Of these apartments, a total of 187 apartments (90.3% of the total) were permanently occupied, while 12 apartments (5.8%) were seasonally occupied and 8 apartments (3.9%) were empty. As of 2009, the construction rate of new housing units was 0 new units per 1000 residents. The vacancy rate for the municipality, in 2010, was 0%.

The historical population is given in the following chart:

== Politics ==
In the 2007 federal election the most popular party was the SP which received 40.76% of the vote. The next three most popular parties were the FDP (21.46%), the SVP (20.13%) and the Green Party (11.43%). In the federal election, a total of 173 votes were cast, and the voter turnout was 48.7%.

== Economy ==
As of 2010, Lüsslingen had an unemployment rate of 5.1%. As of 2008, there were 21 people employed in the primary economic sector and about 11 businesses involved in this sector. 209 people were employed in the secondary sector and there were 7 businesses in this sector. 40 people were employed in the tertiary sector, with 11 businesses in this sector. There were 226 residents of the municipality who were employed in some capacity, of which females made up 44.7% of the workforce.

In 2008 the total number of full-time equivalent jobs was 237. The number of jobs in the primary sector was 11, all of which were in agriculture. The number of jobs in the secondary sector was 197 of which 189 or (95.9%) were in manufacturing and 7 (3.6%) were in construction. The number of jobs in the tertiary sector was 29. In the tertiary sector; 4 or 13.8% were in wholesale or retail sales or the repair of motor vehicles, 6 or 20.7% were in a hotel or restaurant, 1 was a technical professional or scientist, 4 or 13.8% were in education and 4 or 13.8% were in health care.

In 2000, there were 193 workers who commuted into the municipality and 162 workers who commuted away. The municipality is a net importer of workers, with about 1.2 workers entering the municipality for every one leaving. Of the working population, 12.8% used public transportation to get to work, and 54.4% used a private car.

== Religion ==
From the 2000 census, 74 or 16.6% were Roman Catholic, while 285 or 64.0% belonged to the Swiss Reformed Church. Of the rest of the population, there was 1 member of an Orthodox church who belonged, there were 2 individuals (or about 0.45% of the population) who belonged to the Christian Catholic Church, and there were 4 individuals (or about 0.90% of the population) who belonged to another Christian church. There were 17 (or about 3.82% of the population) who were Islamic. 51 (or about 11.46% of the population) belonged to no church, are agnostic or atheist, and 11 individuals (or about 2.47% of the population) did not answer the question.

== Education ==
In Lüsslingen about 187 or (42.0%) of the population have completed non-mandatory upper secondary education, and 40 or (9.0%) have completed additional higher education (either university or a Fachhochschule). Of the 40 who completed tertiary schooling, 70.0% were Swiss men, 25.0% were Swiss women.

As of 2000, there were 64 students in Lüsslingen who came from another municipality, while 48 residents attended schools outside the municipality.
