= Bellach =

- Municipality
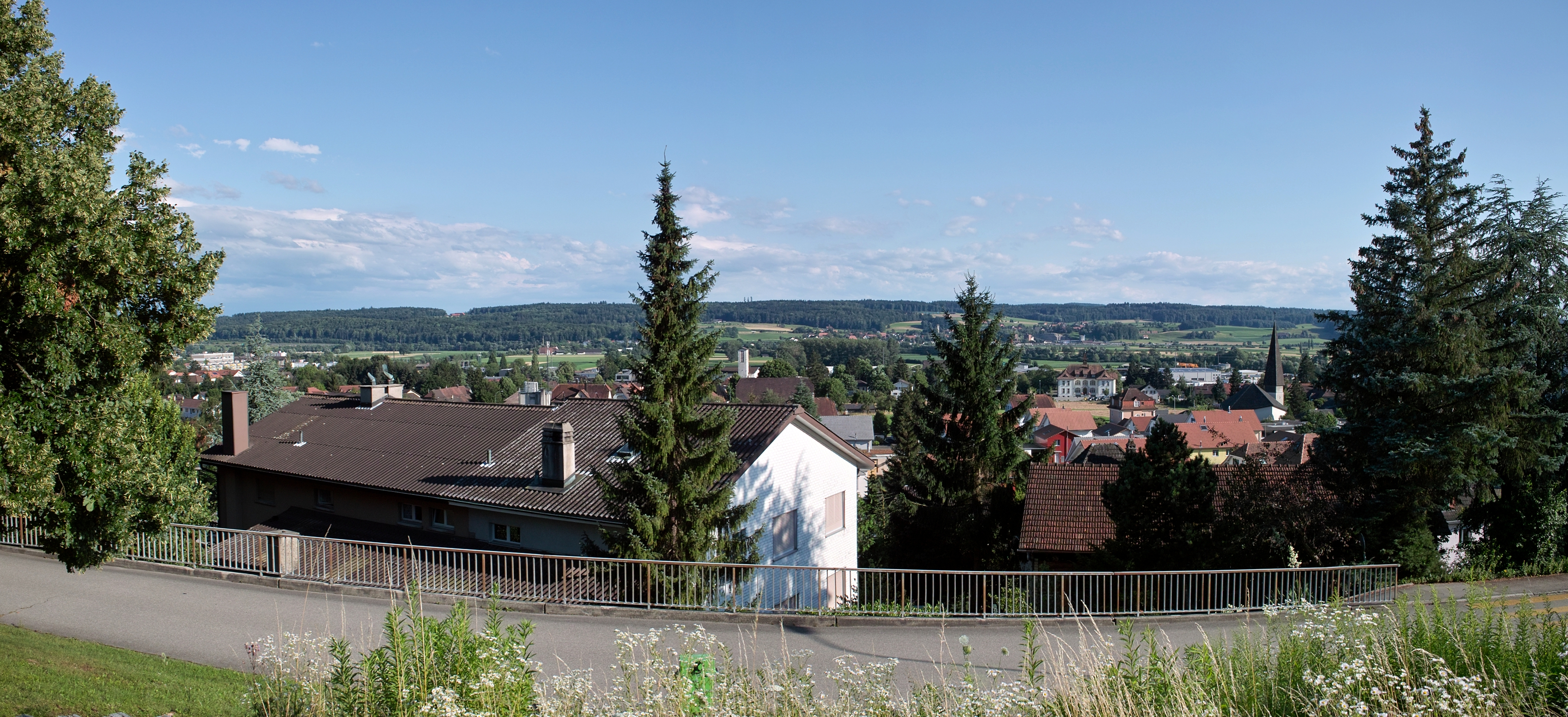
- View of Bellach

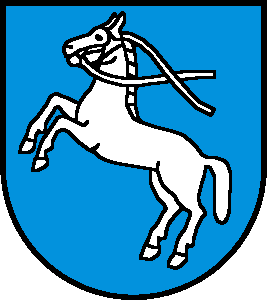
- Coat of arms
- Location of Bellach
- Location within Switzerland Location within Canton of Solothurn
- Coordinates: 47°12′N 7°30′E
- Country: Switzerland
- Canton: Solothurn
- District: Lebern

Area
  - Total: 5.27 km^{2} (2.03 sq mi)
- Elevation: 450 m (1,480 ft)

Population (December 2020)
  - Total: 5,297
  - Density: 1,010/km^{2} (2,600/sq mi)
- Time zone: UTC+01:00 (CET)
  - Summer (DST): UTC+02:00 (CEST)
- Postal code: 4512
- SFOS number: 2542
- ISO 3166 code: CH-SO
- Surrounded by: Biberist, Langendorf, Lommiswil, Lüsslingen, Oberdorf, Selzach, Solothurn
- Website: www.bellach.ch

Bellach is a municipality in the district of Lebern in the canton of Solothurn in Switzerland.

== History ==
Bellach is first mentioned in 1294 as Bella. In 1307 it was mentioned as Bellacho.

== Geography ==
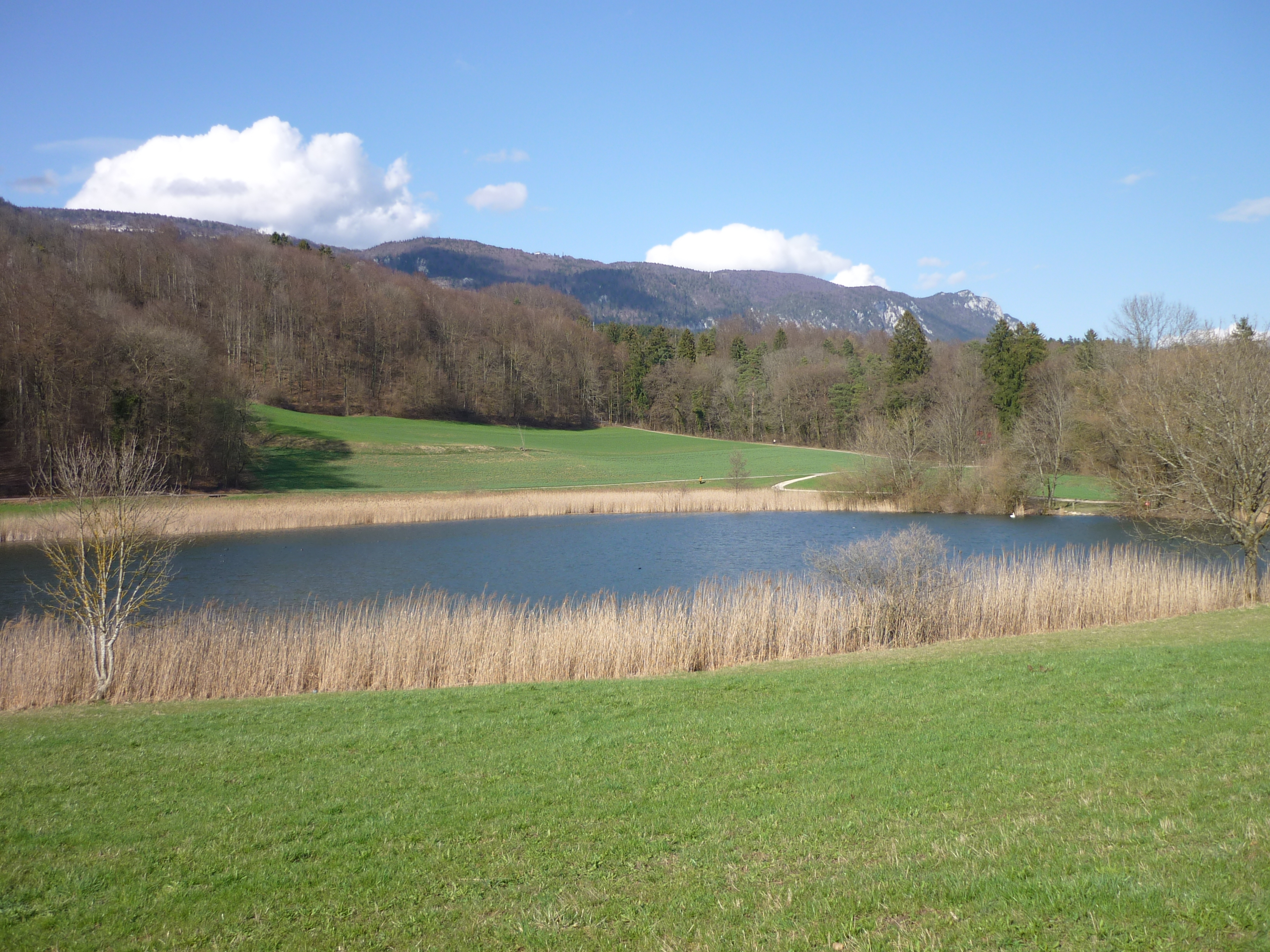
Bellacherweiher

Bellach has an area, as of 2009, of 5.27 square kilometers (2.03 sq mi). Of this area, 2.5 km^{2} (0.97 sq mi) or 47.4% is used for agricultural purposes, while 0.77 km^{2} (0.30 sq mi) or 14.6% is forested. Of the rest of the land, 1.76 km^{2} (0.68 sq mi) or 33.4% is settled (buildings or roads), 0.22 km^{2} (0.085 sq mi) or 4.2% is either rivers or lakes and 0.01 km^{2} (2.5 acres) or 0.2% is unproductive land.

Of the built up area, industrial buildings made up 5.3% of the total area while housing and buildings made up 16.3% and transportation infrastructure made up 9.3%. Power and water infrastructure as well as other special developed areas made up 1.5% of the area Out of the forested land, 12.9% of the total land area is heavily forested and 1.7% is covered with orchards or small clusters of trees. Of the agricultural land, 35.1% is used for growing crops and 10.6% is pastures, while 1.7% is used for orchards or vine crops. Of the water in the municipality, 0.8% is in lakes and 3.4% is in rivers and streams.

The municipality is located in the Lebern district, in the southern foothills of the Jura Mountains, west of Solothurn. It consists of the former villages of Ober-Bellach, Nieder-Bellach and Gärisch, which have all grown together. The municipalities of Biberist, Derendingen, Luterbach, Bellach, Langendorf and Solothurn are considering a merger at a date in the future into the new municipality of with an, as of 2011, undetermined name.

Bellacher Weiher is a pond and nature preserve in the municipality.

== Coat of arms ==
The blazon of the municipal coat of arms is Azure a Horse Argent rampant and harnessed.

== Demographics ==
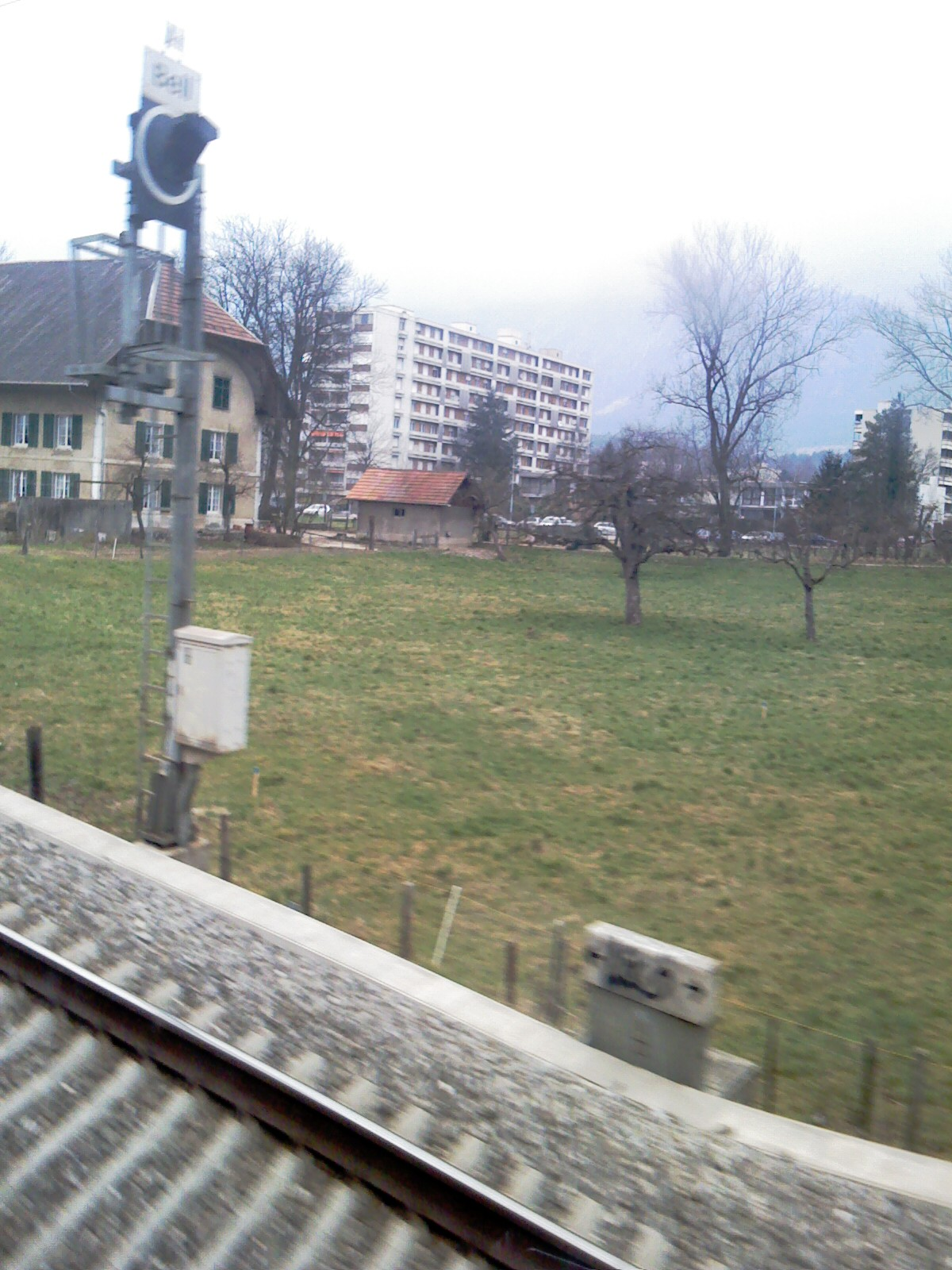
View of Bellach, showing newer high-rise buildings

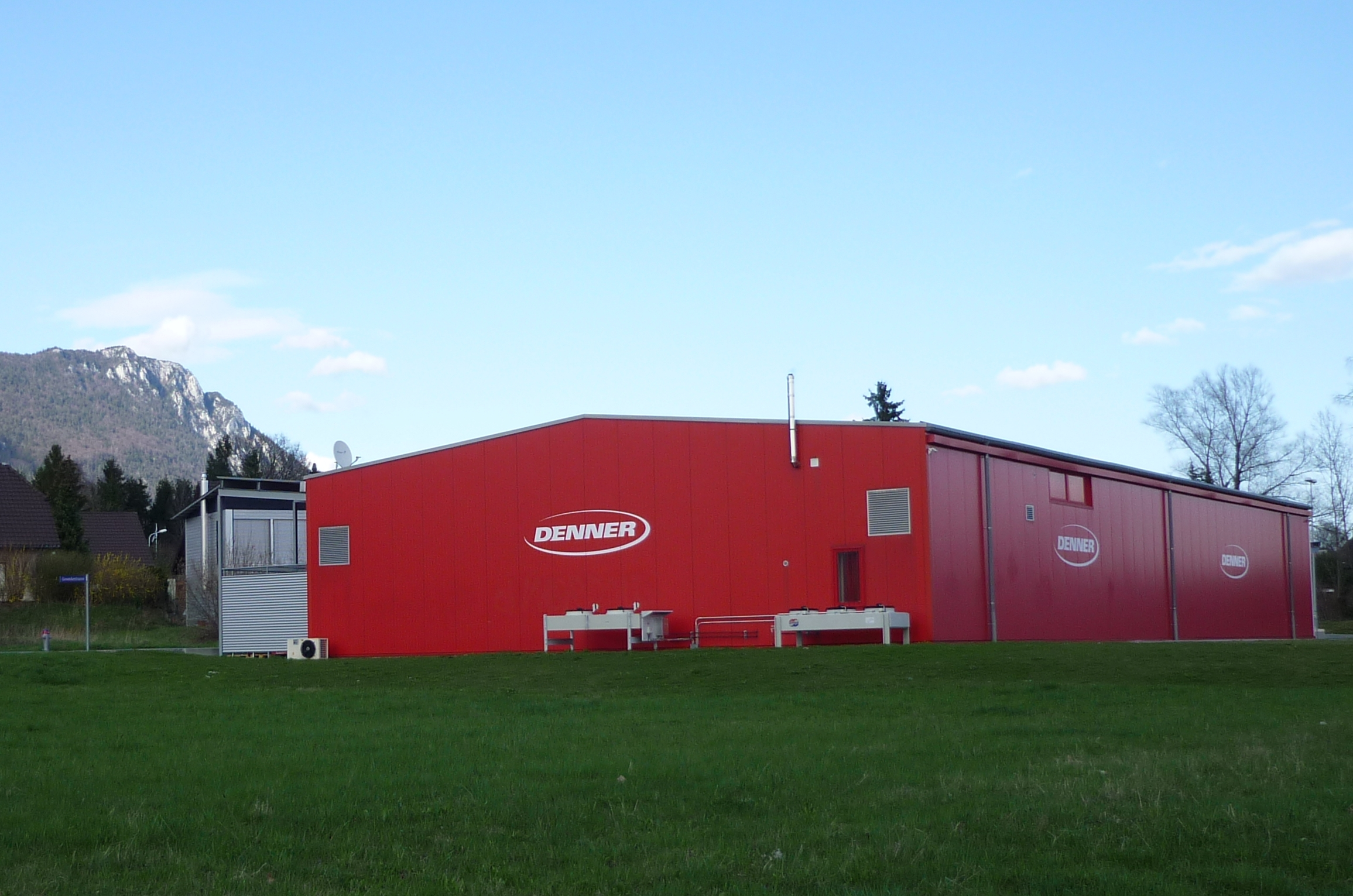
Denner food store in Bellach

Bellach has a population (as of December 2020) of 5,297. As of 2008, 26.4% of the population are resident foreign nationals. Over the last 10 years (1999–2009) the population has changed at a rate of -0.9%.

Most of the population (as of 2000) speaks German (4,191 or 83.4%), with Italian being second most common (210 or 4.2%) and Turkish being third (185 or 3.7%). There are 46 people who speak French and 3 people who speak Romansh.

As of 2008, the gender distribution of the population was 49.8% male and 50.2% female. The population was made up of 1,831 Swiss men (35.7% of the population) and 725 (14.1%) non-Swiss men. There were 1,933 Swiss women (37.7%) and 642 (12.5%) non-Swiss women. Of the population in the municipality 1,236 or about 24.6% were born in Bellach and lived there in 2000. There were 1,534 or 30.5% who were born in the same canton, while 1,083 or 21.5% were born somewhere else in Switzerland, and 1,061 or 21.1% were born outside of Switzerland.

In 2008 there were 24 live births to Swiss citizens and 12 births to non-Swiss citizens, and in same time span there were 40 deaths of Swiss citizens and 3 non-Swiss citizen deaths. Ignoring immigration and emigration, the population of Swiss citizens decreased by 16 while the foreign population increased by 9. There were 7 Swiss men who immigrated back to Switzerland and 4 Swiss women who emigrated from Switzerland. At the same time, there were 16 non-Swiss men and 7 non-Swiss women who immigrated from another country to Switzerland. The total Swiss population change in 2008 (from all sources, including moves across municipal borders) was a decrease of 36 and the non-Swiss population decreased by 12 people. This represents a population growth rate of -0.9%.

The age distribution, as of 2000, in Bellach is; 370 children or 7.4% of the population are between 0 and 6 years old and 842 teenagers or 16.7% are between 7 and 19. Of the adult population, 264 people or 5.3% of the population are between 20 and 24 years old. 1,469 people or 29.2% are between 25 and 44, and 1,339 people or 26.6% are between 45 and 64. The senior population distribution is 598 people or 11.9% of the population are between 65 and 79 years old and there are 145 people or 2.9% who are over 80.

As of 2000, there were 1,913 people who were single and never married in the municipality. There were 2,566 married individuals, 272 widows or widowers and 276 individuals who are divorced.

As of 2000, there were 2,092 private households in the municipality, and an average of 2.4 persons per household. There were 611 households that consist of only one person and 134 households with five or more people. Out of a total of 2,116 households that answered this question, 28.9% were households made up of just one person and there were 16 adults who lived with their parents. Of the rest of the households, there are 656 married couples without children, 685 married couples with children There were 106 single parents with a child or children. There were 18 households that were made up of unrelated people and 24 households that were made up of some sort of institution or another collective housing.

In 2000 there were 689 single family homes (or 68.4% of the total) out of a total of 1,007 inhabited buildings. There were 184 multi-family buildings (18.3%), along with 81 multi-purpose buildings that were mostly used for housing (8.0%) and 53 other use buildings (commercial or industrial) that also had some housing (5.3%). Of the single family homes 20 were built before 1919, while 98 were built between 1990 and 2000. The greatest number of single family homes (146) were built between 1971 and 1980.

In 2000 there were 2,322 apartments in the municipality. The most common apartment size was 4 rooms of which there were 828. There were 38 single room apartments and 678 apartments with five or more rooms. Of these apartments, a total of 2,075 apartments (89.4% of the total) were permanently occupied, while 101 apartments (4.3%) were seasonally occupied and 146 apartments (6.3%) were empty. As of 2009, the construction rate of new housing units was 3.9 new units per 1000 residents. The vacancy rate for the municipality, in 2010, was 1.89%.

The historical population is given in the following chart:

== Politics ==
In the 2007 federal election the most popular party was the SVP which received 31.21% of the vote. The next three most popular parties were the FDP (23.29%), the CVP (18.51%) and the SP (17.04%). In the federal election, a total of 1,625 votes were cast, and the voter turnout was 50.8%.

== Economy ==
As of 2010, Bellach had an unemployment rate of 4.6%. As of 2008, there were 44 people employed in the primary economic sector and about 21 businesses involved in this sector. 1,332 people were employed in the secondary sector and there were 58 businesses in this sector. 851 people were employed in the tertiary sector, with 127 businesses in this sector. There were 2,629 residents of the municipality who were employed in some capacity, of which females made up 42.1% of the workforce.

In 2008 the total number of full-time equivalent jobs was 1,992. The number of jobs in the primary sector was 27, all of which were in agriculture. The number of jobs in the secondary sector was 1,263 of which 1,120 or (88.7%) were in manufacturing and 141 (11.2%) were in construction. The number of jobs in the tertiary sector was 702. In the tertiary sector; 328 or 46.7% were in wholesale or retail sales or the repair of motor vehicles, 24 or 3.4% were in the movement and storage of goods, 34 or 4.8% were in a hotel or restaurant, 9 or 1.3% were in the information industry, 10 or 1.4% were the insurance or financial industry, 100 or 14.2% were technical professionals or scientists, 43 or 6.1% were in education and 60 or 8.5% were in health care.

In 2000, there were 1,394 workers who commuted into the municipality and 1,955 workers who commuted away. The municipality is a net exporter of workers, with about 1.4 workers leaving the municipality for every one entering. Of the working population, 16.9% used public transportation to get to work, and 55.5% used a private car.

== Religion ==
From the 2000 census, 1,926 or 38.3% were Roman Catholic, while 1,559 or 31.0% belonged to the Swiss Reformed Church. Of the rest of the population, there were 63 members of an Orthodox church (or about 1.25% of the population), there were 15 individuals (or about 0.30% of the population) who belonged to the Christian Catholic Church, and there were 84 individuals (or about 1.67% of the population) who belonged to another Christian church. There was 1 individual who was Jewish, and 448 (or about 8.91% of the population) who were Islamic. There were 7 individuals who were Buddhist, 18 individuals who were Hindu and 6 individuals who belonged to another church. 741 (or about 14.74% of the population) belonged to no church, are agnostic or atheist, and 159 individuals (or about 3.16% of the population) did not answer the question.

== Education ==
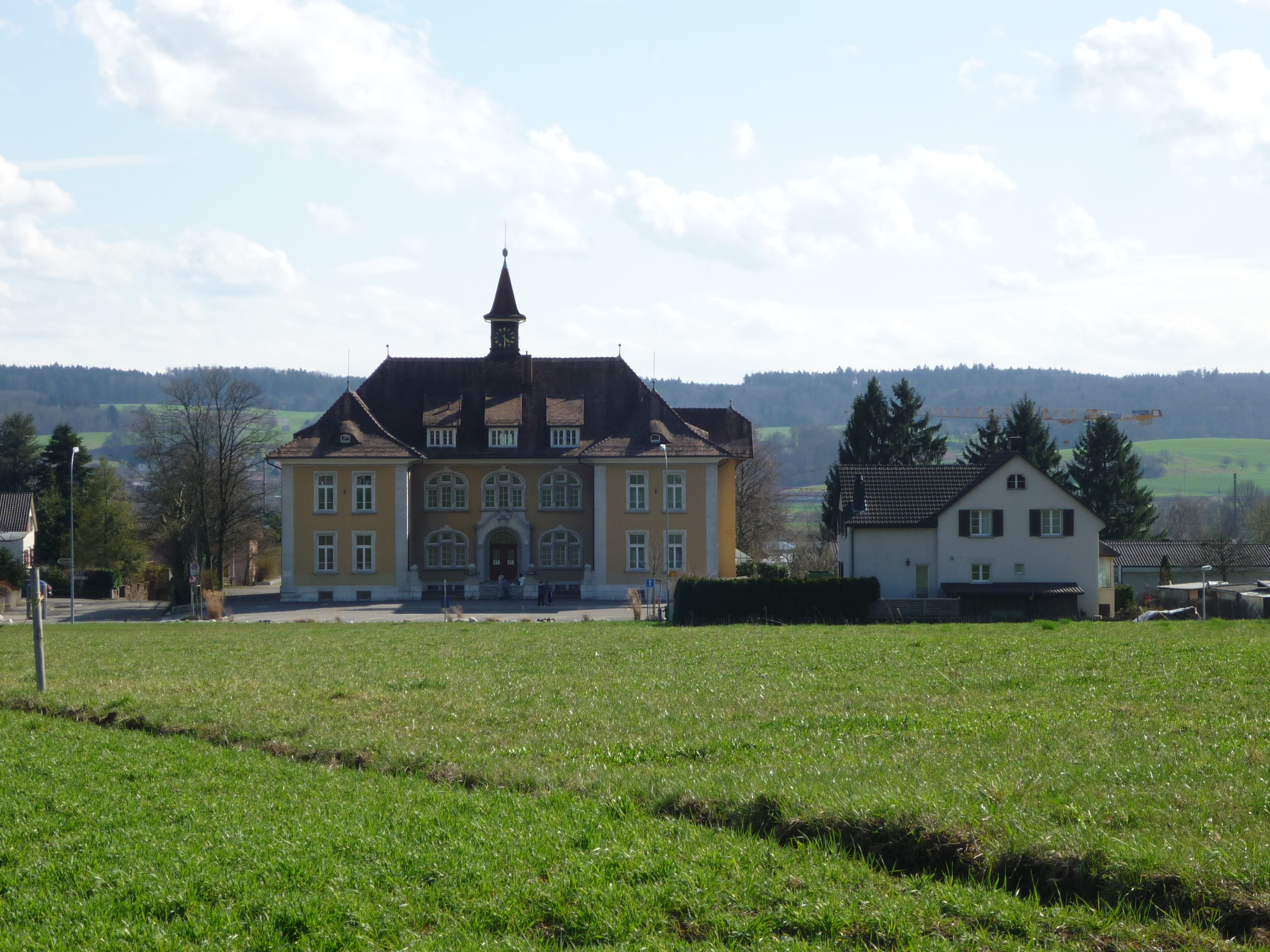
School house in Bellach

In Bellach about 1,959 or (39.0%) of the population have completed non-mandatory upper secondary education, and 500 or (9.9%) have completed additional higher education (either university or a Fachhochschule). Of the 500 who completed tertiary schooling, 68.4% were Swiss men, 18.0% were Swiss women, 10.6% were non-Swiss men and 3.0% were non-Swiss women.

As of 2000, there were 82 students in Bellach who came from another municipality, while 240 residents attended schools outside the municipality.
