= Selzach =

- Municipality
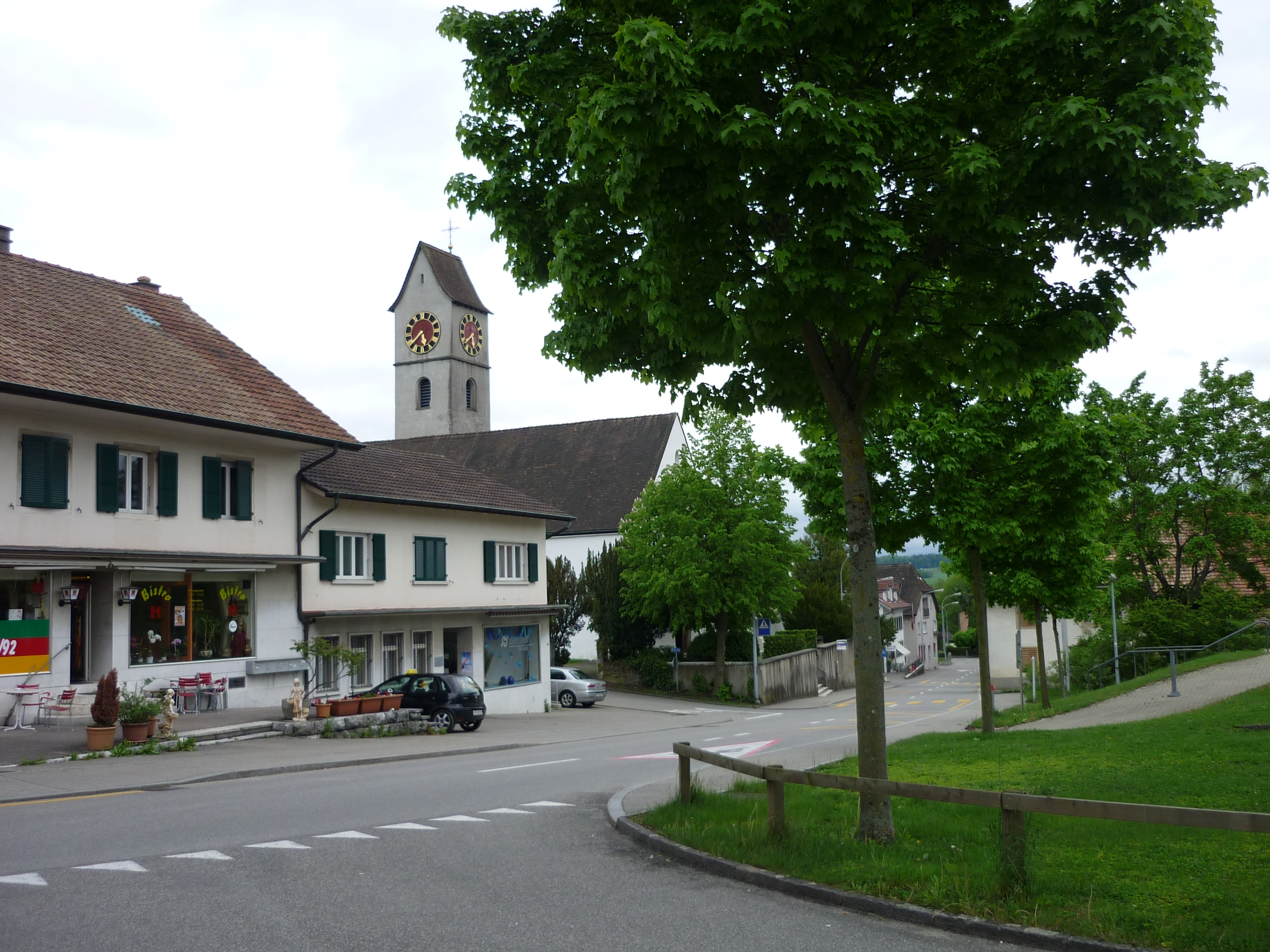
- Selzach village

- Flag Coat of arms
- Location of Selzach
- Location within Switzerland Location within Canton of Solothurn
- Coordinates: 47°12′N 7°27′E
- Country: Switzerland
- Canton: Solothurn
- District: Lebern

Area
  - Total: 19.48 km^{2} (7.52 sq mi)
- Elevation: 445 m (1,460 ft)

Population (December 2020)
  - Total: 3,491
  - Density: 179.2/km^{2} (464.2/sq mi)
- Time zone: UTC+01:00 (CET)
  - Summer (DST): UTC+02:00 (CEST)
- Postal code: 2545
- SFOS number: 2556
- ISO 3166 code: CH-SO
- Surrounded by: Bellach, Bettlach, Court (BE), Gänsbrunnen, Grenchen, Leuzigen (BE), Lommiswil, Lüsslingen, Nennigkofen, Oberdorf
- Website: selzach.ch

Selzach is a municipality in the district of Lebern in the canton of Solothurn in Switzerland.

== History ==
Selzach is first mentioned in 1181 as Selsacho.

== Geography ==
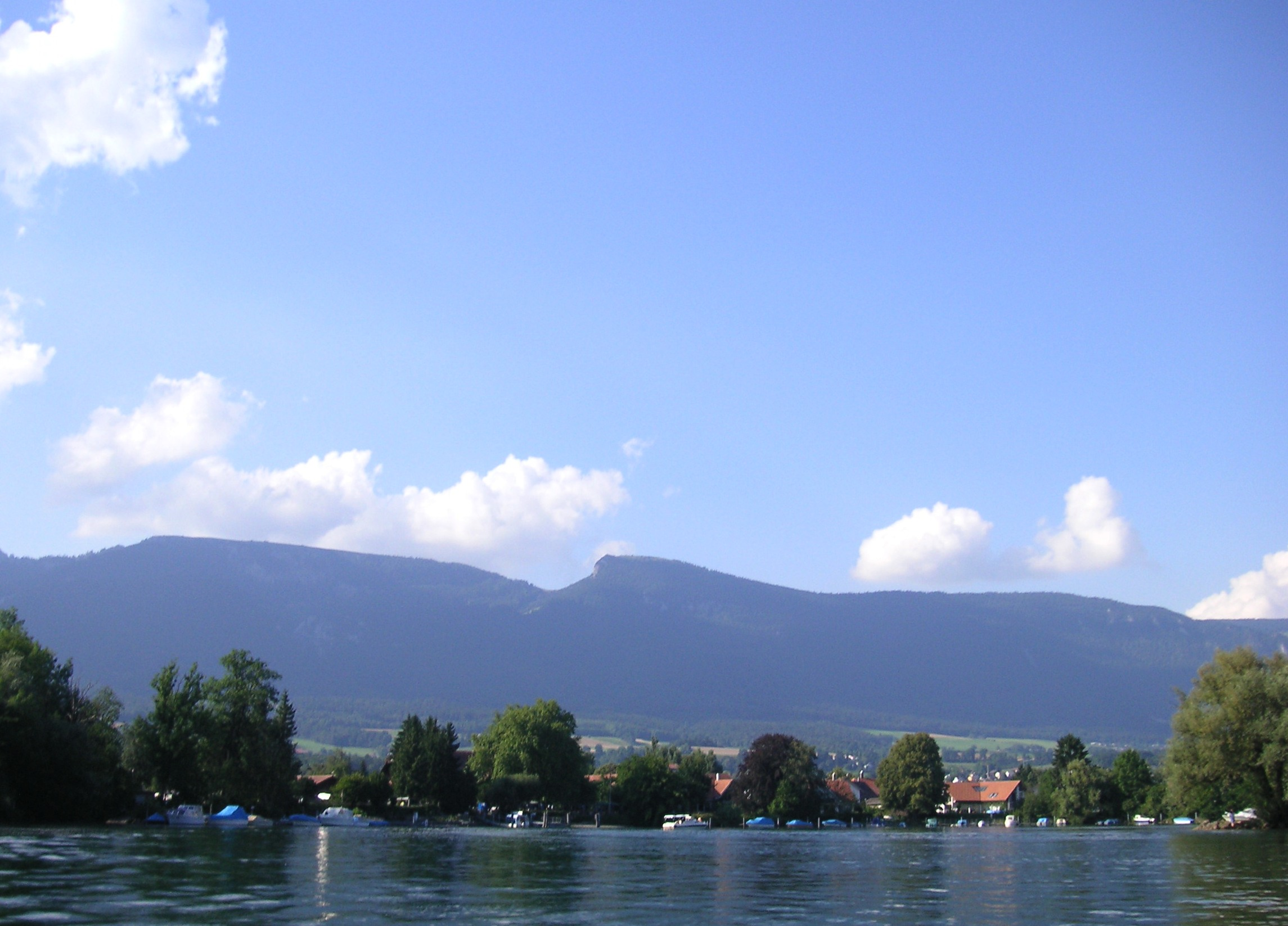
Looking from Altreu toward Selzach

Aerial view (1949)

Selzach has an area, as of 2009, of 19.48 square kilometers (7.52 sq mi). Of this area, 9.79 km^{2} (3.78 sq mi) or 50.3% is used for agricultural purposes, while 7.44 km^{2} (2.87 sq mi) or 38.2% is forested. Of the rest of the land, 1.79 km^{2} (0.69 sq mi) or 9.2% is settled (buildings or roads), 0.34 km^{2} (0.13 sq mi) or 1.7% is either rivers or lakes and 0.11 km^{2} (27 acres) or 0.6% is unproductive land.

Of the built up area, housing and buildings made up 4.2% and transportation infrastructure made up 3.3%. Out of the forested land, 35.7% of the total land area is heavily forested and 2.5% is covered with orchards or small clusters of trees. Of the agricultural land, 32.6% is used for growing crops and 9.2% is pastures, while 1.1% is used for orchards or vine crops and 7.3% is used for alpine pastures. All the water in the municipality is flowing water.

The municipality is located in the Lebern district. It stretches from the Aare river, at an elevation of 428 m (1,404 ft), to the Hasenmatt mountain on the edge of the Jura Mountains, at an elevation of 1,445 m (4,741 ft). It consists of the village of Selzach, the hamlet of Haag and former city of Altreu.

== Coat of arms ==
The blazon of the municipal coat of arms is Gules a Salt Cellar Argent.

== Demographics ==
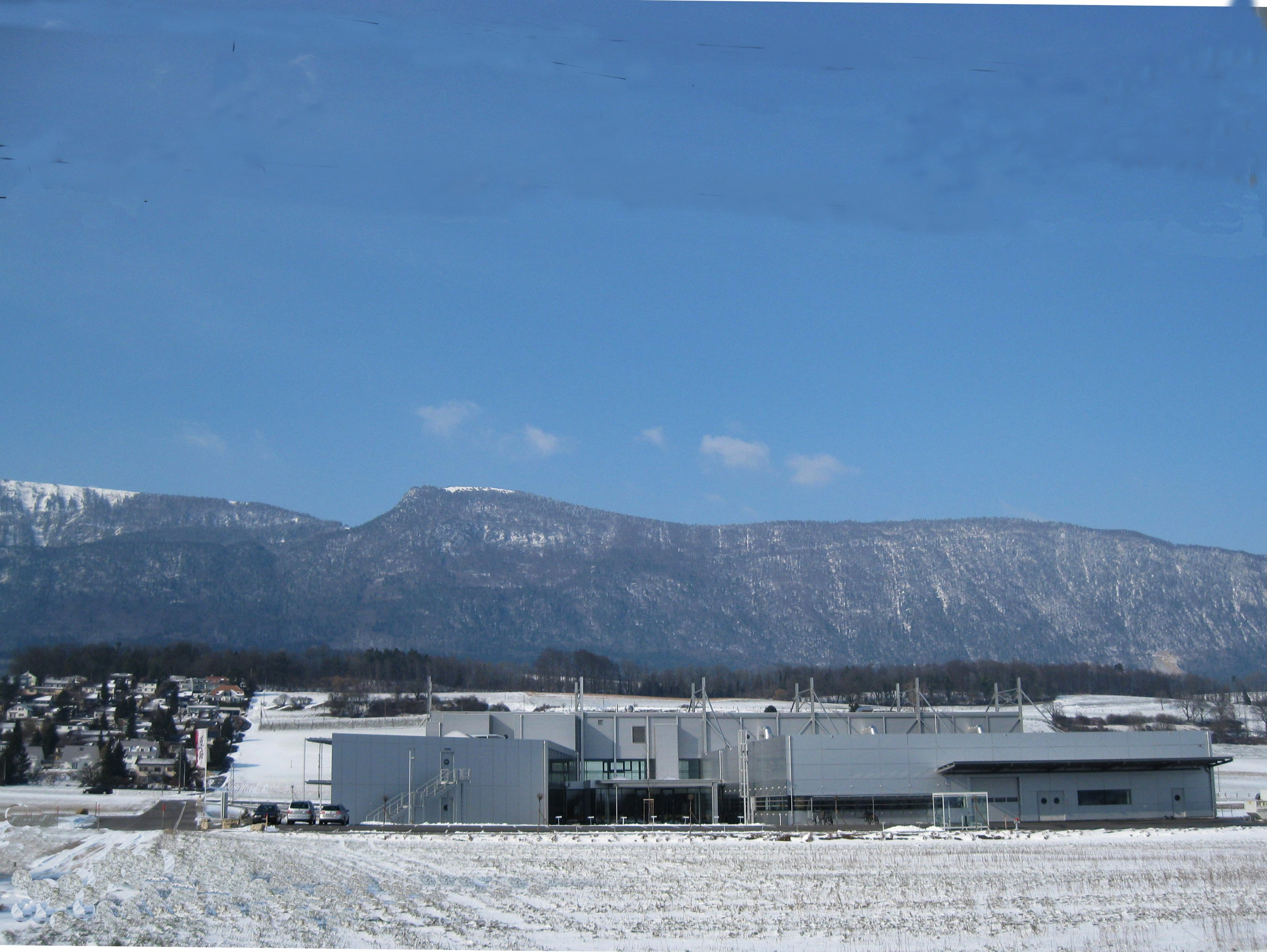
Looking from Selzach toward the Jura Mountains

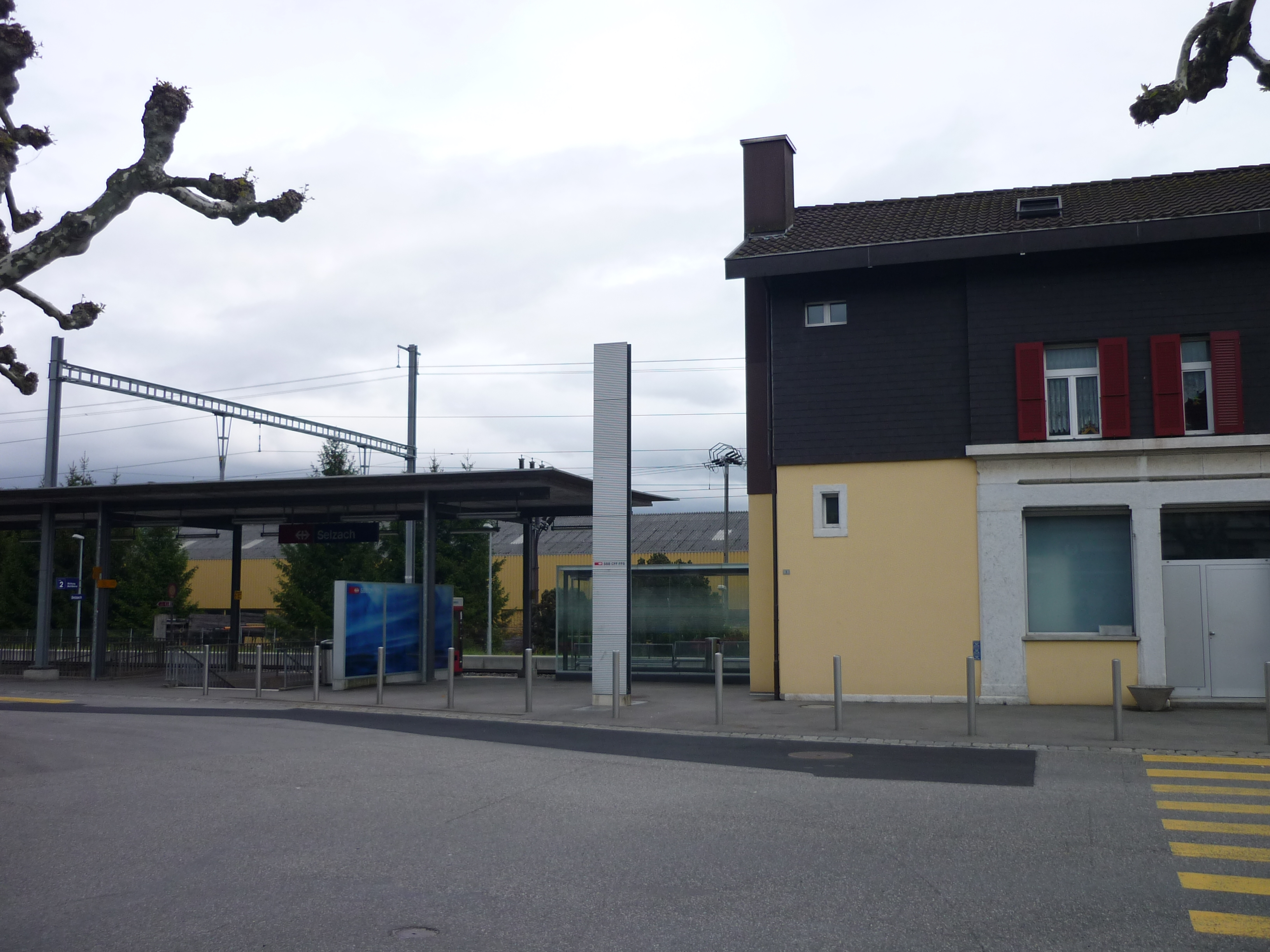
Selzach Train Station

Selzach has a population (as of December 2020) of 3,491. As of 2008, 11.9% of the population are resident foreign nationals. Over the last 10 years (1999–2009 ) the population has changed at a rate of 9.1%.

Most of the population (as of 2000) speaks German (2,600 or 92.5%), with French being second most common (37 or 1.3%) and Italian being third (33 or 1.2%).

As of 2008, the gender distribution of the population was 50.5% male and 49.5% female. The population was made up of 1,347 Swiss men (43.5% of the population) and 217 (7.0%) non-Swiss men. There were 1,352 Swiss women (43.6%) and 183 (5.9%) non-Swiss women. Of the population in the municipality 1,057 or about 37.6% were born in Selzach and lived there in 2000. There were 755 or 26.9% who were born in the same canton, while 574 or 20.4% were born somewhere else in Switzerland, and 292 or 10.4% were born outside of Switzerland.

In 2008 there were 27 live births to Swiss citizens and 4 births to non-Swiss citizens, and in same time span there were 28 deaths of Swiss citizens. Ignoring immigration and emigration, the population of Swiss citizens decreased by 1 while the foreign population increased by 4. There were 5 Swiss men and 1 Swiss woman who emigrated from Switzerland. At the same time, there were 3 non-Swiss men and 3 non-Swiss women who immigrated from another country to Switzerland. The total Swiss population change in 2008 (from all sources, including moves across municipal borders) was an increase of 41 and the non-Swiss population increased by 42 people. This represents a population growth rate of 2.8%.

The age distribution, as of 2000, in Selzach is; 210 children or 7.5% of the population are between 0 and 6 years old and 444 teenagers or 15.8% are between 7 and 19. Of the adult population, 143 people or 5.1% of the population are between 20 and 24 years old. 793 people or 28.2% are between 25 and 44, and 767 people or 27.3% are between 45 and 64. The senior population distribution is 361 people or 12.8% of the population are between 65 and 79 years old and there are 92 people or 3.3% who are over 80.

As of 2000, there were 1,072 people who were single and never married in the municipality. There were 1,426 married individuals, 163 widows or widowers and 149 individuals who are divorced.

As of 2000, there were 1,143 private households in the municipality, and an average of 2.4 persons per household. There were 317 households that consist of only one person and 78 households with five or more people. Out of a total of 1,159 households that answered this question, 27.4% were households made up of just one person and there were 18 adults who lived with their parents. Of the rest of the households, there are 358 married couples without children, 389 married couples with children There were 48 single parents with a child or children. There were 13 households that were made up of unrelated people and 16 households that were made up of some sort of institution or another collective housing.

In 2000 there were 507 single family homes (or 63.8% of the total) out of a total of 795 inhabited buildings. There were 141 multi-family buildings (17.7%), along with 92 multi-purpose buildings that were mostly used for housing (11.6%) and 55 other use buildings (commercial or industrial) that also had some housing (6.9%). Of the single family homes 31 were built before 1919, while 72 were built between 1990 and 2000. The greatest number of single family homes (109) were built between 1961 and 1970.

In 2000 there were 1,250 apartments in the municipality. The most common apartment size was 4 rooms of which there were 387. There were 29 single room apartments and 458 apartments with five or more rooms. Of these apartments, a total of 1,120 apartments (89.6% of the total) were permanently occupied, while 70 apartments (5.6%) were seasonally occupied and 60 apartments (4.8%) were empty. As of 2009, the construction rate of new housing units was 4.2 new units per 1000 residents. The vacancy rate for the municipality, in 2010, was 0.35%.

The historical population is given in the following chart:

== Heritage sites of national significance ==
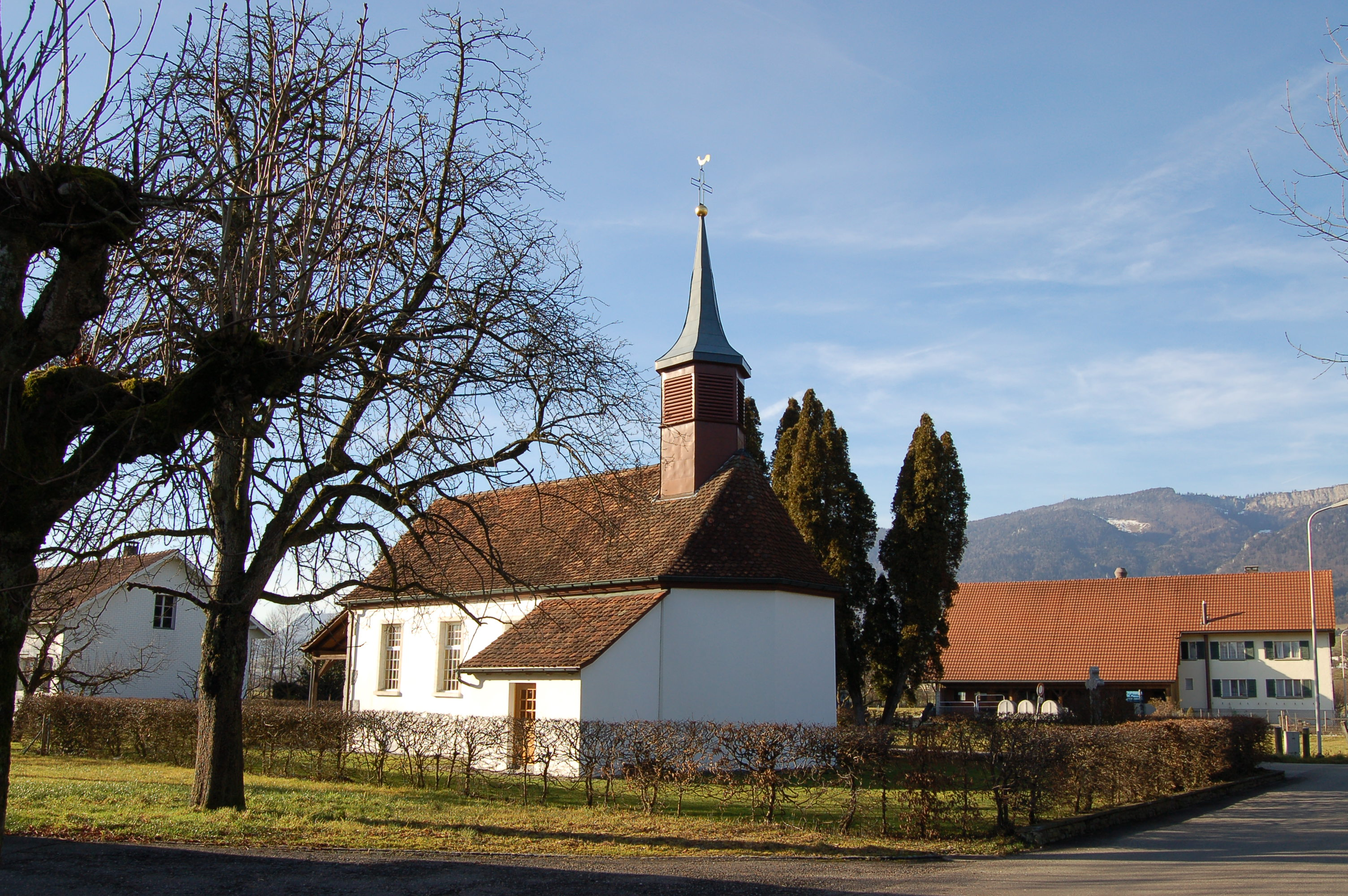
Chapel of Altreu

The medieval ruined city of Altreu, is listed as a Swiss heritage site of national significance.

== Politics ==
In the 2007 federal election the most popular party was the SVP which received 32.98% of the vote. The next three most popular parties were the FDP (20.62%), the CVP (20.39%) and the SP (17.3%). In the federal election, a total of 1,026 votes were cast, and the voter turnout was 47.8%.

== Economy ==
As of 2010, Selzach had an unemployment rate of 2.7%. As of 2008, there were 157 people employed in the primary economic sector and about 50 businesses involved in this sector. 981 people were employed in the secondary sector and there were 48 businesses in this sector. 262 people were employed in the tertiary sector, with 79 businesses in this sector. There were 1,511 residents of the municipality who were employed in some capacity, of which females made up 41.6% of the workforce.

In 2008 the total number of full-time equivalent jobs was 1,207. The number of jobs in the primary sector was 81, of which 70 were in agriculture and 11 were in forestry or lumber production. The number of jobs in the secondary sector was 929 of which 808 or (87.0%) were in manufacturing and 117 (12.6%) were in construction. The number of jobs in the tertiary sector was 197. In the tertiary sector; 77 or 39.1% were in wholesale or retail sales or the repair of motor vehicles, 7 or 3.6% were in the movement and storage of goods, 27 or 13.7% were in a hotel or restaurant, 5 or 2.5% were in the information industry, 10 or 5.1% were the insurance or financial industry, 13 or 6.6% were technical professionals or scientists, 27 or 13.7% were in education and 7 or 3.6% were in health care.

In 2000, there were 906 workers who commuted into the municipality and 1,039 workers who commuted away. The municipality is a net exporter of workers, with about 1.1 workers leaving the municipality for every one entering. Of the working population, 12.6% used public transportation to get to work, and 60.4% used a private car.

== Religion ==
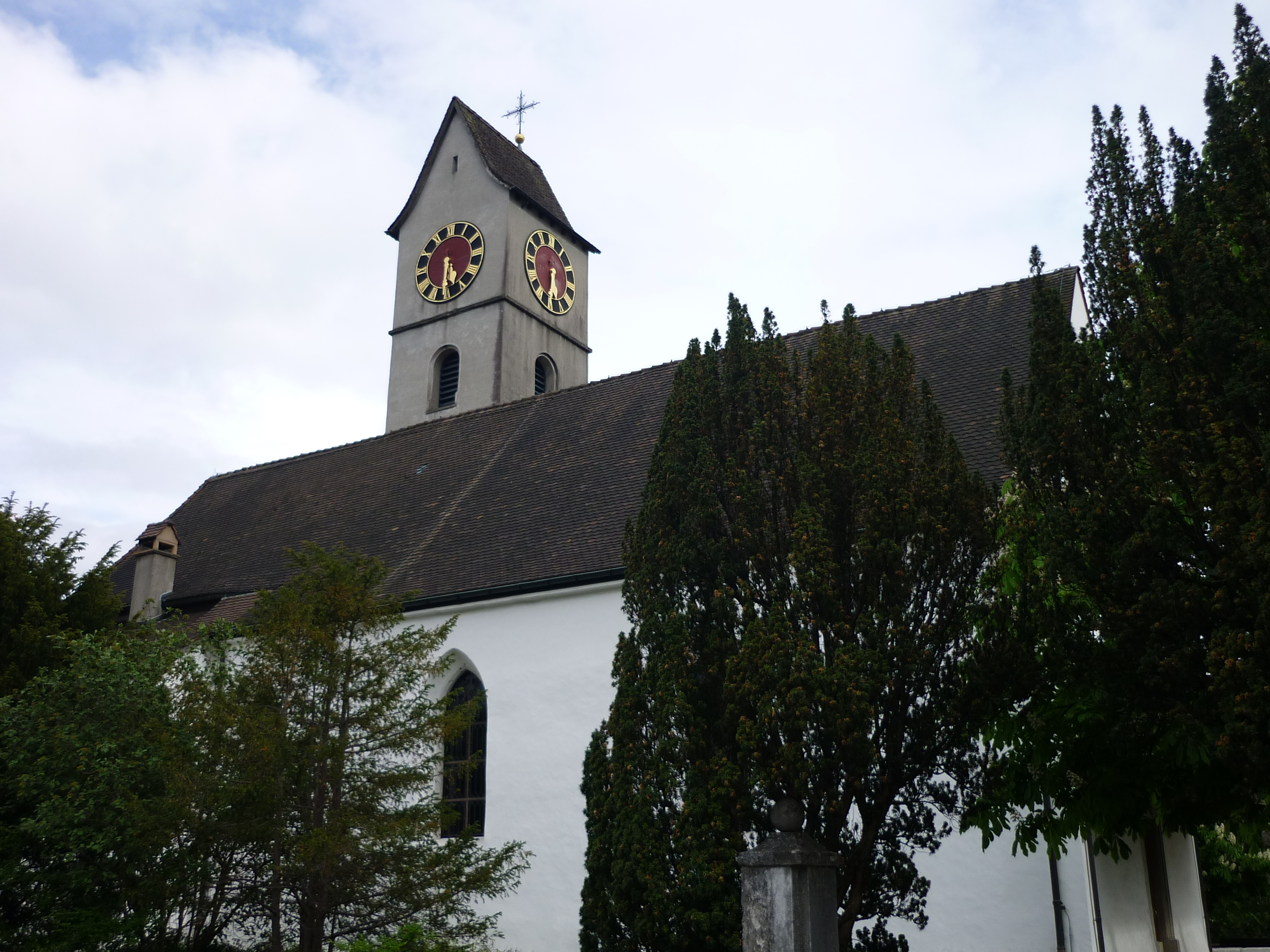
Catholic Church of Selzach

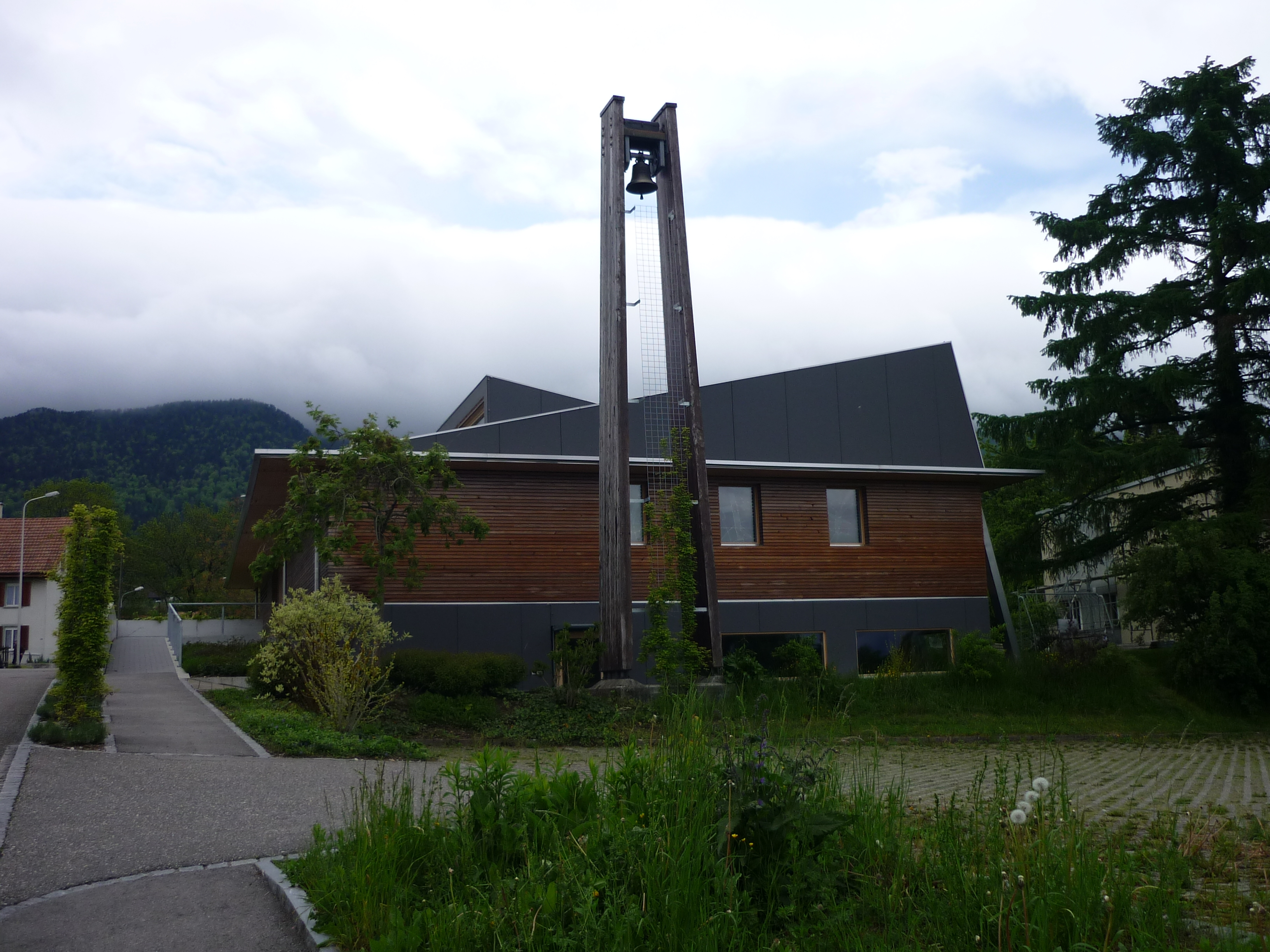
Reformed Church of Selzach

From the 2000 census, 1,192 or 42.4% were Roman Catholic, while 945 or 33.6% belonged to the Swiss Reformed Church. Of the rest of the population, there were 14 members of an Orthodox church (or about 0.50% of the population), there were 14 individuals (or about 0.50% of the population) who belonged to the Christian Catholic Church, and there were 40 individuals (or about 1.42% of the population) who belonged to another Christian church. There were 60 (or about 2.14% of the population) who were Islamic. There were 3 individuals who were Buddhist, 3 individuals who were Hindu and 3 individuals who belonged to another church. 401 (or about 14.27% of the population) belonged to no church, are agnostic or atheist, and 135 individuals (or about 4.80% of the population) did not answer the question.

== Education ==
In Selzach about 1,116 or (39.7%) of the population have completed non-mandatory upper secondary education, and 314 or (11.2%) have completed additional higher education (either university or a Fachhochschule). Of the 314 who completed tertiary schooling, 74.5% were Swiss men, 17.8% were Swiss women, 4.5% were non-Swiss men and 3.2% were non-Swiss women.

As of 2000, there were 103 students in Selzach who came from another municipality, while 122 residents attended schools outside the municipality.
