= Buren Castle =

Buren Castle may refer to:

- Castle Buren, in the Dutch province of Gelderland
- Büren Castle, in the Swiss canton of Bern
- Bueren Castle, in the Belgian province of East Flanders
