= Oberwil =

Oberwil may refer to several places in Switzerland:

- Oberwil, Basel-Country
- Oberwil im Simmental, Berne
- Oberwil bei Büren, Berne
- Oberwil-Lieli, Aargau
- Oberwil (Dägerlen), Zurich
- Oberwil (Nürensdorf), Zurich
- Oberwil (Pfäffikon), Pfäffikon, Zurich
- Oberwil, Thurgau, Gachnang, Thurgau
- Oberwil bei Zug, Zug
- Oberwil, St. Gallen, Waldkirch, St. Gallen
