= Spar- und Leihkasse Bucheggberg =

- Company type: Aktiengesellschaft
- Industry: Financial services
- Founded: 1850
- Headquarters: Hauptstrasse 69, 4584, Lüterswil-Gächliwil, Switzerland
- Website: www.slbucheggberg.ch
- Footnotes / references SWIFT: SLBUCH22XXX

Spar- und Leihkasse Bucheggberg (lit. 'Bucheggberg Savings and Lending Bank'; SLB) is one of the oldest Swiss banks, founded in 1850 and located in Lüterswil-Gächliwil town, Bucheggberg District in the Canton of Solothurn.

The main business of this regional bank is traditionally in retail banking and mortgage loans. Besides its headquarters in Lüterswil, the SLB has its branch in trade fairs.

In 1850 the bank was founded in the form of stock corporation and its shares has been traded off-exchange. The bank employs 18 people on a part-time basis and its balance sheet total was 455 million CHF in 2012.
