= Büren an der Aare =

Büren a.A. / Büren an der Aare
- Municipality
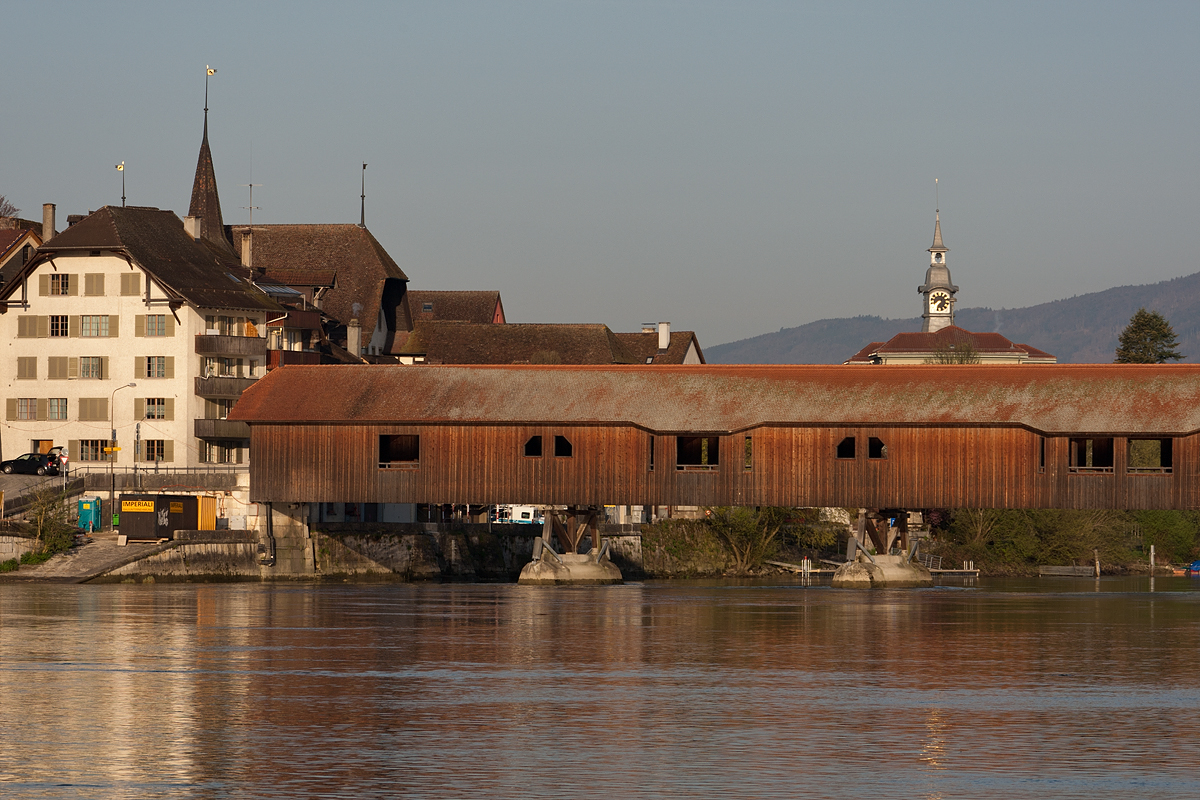
- Büren with the historic wooden bridge spanning the Aare

- Flag Coat of arms
- Location of Büren a.A. / Büren an der Aare
- Location within Switzerland Location within Canton of Bern
- Coordinates: 47°8′N 7°22′E
- Country: Switzerland
- Canton: Bern
- District: Seeland

Area
  - Total: 12.70 km^{2} (4.90 sq mi)
- Elevation: 443 m (1,453 ft)

Population (December 2020)
  - Total: 3,622
  - Density: 285.2/km^{2} (738.7/sq mi)
- Time zone: UTC+01:00 (CET)
  - Summer (DST): UTC+02:00 (CEST)
- Postal code: 3294
- SFOS number: 383
- ISO 3166 code: CH-BE
- Surrounded by: Diessbach bei Büren, Dotzigen, Grenchen (SO), Lengnau, Meienried, Meinisberg, Oberwil bei Büren, Rüti bei Büren, Safnern, Schnottwil (SO)
- Website: www.bueren.ch

Büren an der Aare (usually abbreviated with Büren a.A., means Büren on the Aare) is a historic town and a municipality in the Seeland administrative district in the canton of Bern in Switzerland.

== History ==
Büren an der Aare is first mentioned in 1185 as Buirro. In 1236 it was mentioned as Buron. The formerly independent village of Reiben was first mentioned in 1309. It became part of Büren an der Aare in 1911.

The earliest trace of humans in Büren are scattered neolithic and La Tene items. The Roman era road between Aventicum and Salodurum (Solothurn) runs through the area that would become the municipality. Roman ruins include part of the road and a milestone at Bürenmoos, a canal at Burgweg and what may have been a country estate on Kirchmatt. Above the town, on the Schlosshubel hill, was the high medieval Strassberg Castle, the home of the Baron of Strassberg. The town was built on a narrow strip of land between the Städtiberg and the Aare. The town received a town charter from Berchtold I of Strassberg in 1260, which was confirmed in 1288. Under the Barons, the town became the center of the Büren Herrschaft. During the 13th and 14th centuries, the Counts of Neuchâtel gained power in the Herrschaft. In 1345, financial difficulties forced Imer of Strassberg to pledge some rights in the town to Solothurn. In 1369 Solothurn also acquired the right to collect duties and tolls in Büren. In 1375 Enguerrand de Coucy besieged the town, but did not take it. After Imer's death the town was inherited by the Counts of Neu-Kyburg, who then sold it to Austria. During the Sempach War, Büren was besieged and captured by Bern and in 1388 it was placed under joint Bern-Solothurn control. In 1393, the captured land was finally divided and Büren became the capital of a new Bernese bailiwick. In 1620-25 Büren Castle was built on the main street as the official residence of the Bernese bailiff.

The oldest part of the town church of St. Catherine is the choir from the third quarter of the 13th century. The rest of the church was completed between then and 1500. By 1375 it was an independent parish church.

The town council appointed its first recorded Schultheiss in 1254. The oldest town seal is from 1273. The 1288 town charter granted it the right to hold markets. In 1284, a toll bridge over the Aare was first mentioned. In 1478, the salt, iron, steel, wool and linen markets came under Bernese control. The town had both a market square and docks on the Aare as well as inns and warehouses to encourage traders to come to Büren. In 1481, weekly markets were added to the quarterly fairs that they had been holding. The town's economy was based on both trade and agriculture. During the 15th and 16th century a new town hall was built with a market hall on the ground floor. In the 16th century a hospital and school opened. Starting in the 15th century, the town began operating mountain pastures, a dairy and a cheese-maker as a fief of the Prince-Bishop of Basel. The now disused brickworks was first mentioned in 1630.

After the 1798 French invasion, it became the capital of the Helvetic Republic's Büren District. After the Act of Mediation and the Congress of Vienna the district remained as a part of the Canton of Bern.

During the 19th century, the town began to decline. No major railway line passes through it and water transportation had declined in importance. In 1876 the regional Lyss-Solothurn railway line connected the town to its neighbors. A few small factories moved in including watch manufactures, but they have since closed. Only the old gear and machinery factory (built in 1946) and a meat processing plant (built in 1945) remain of the older factories. However, a new anodizing and electronics moved into Büren in the end of the 20th century. The Nidau-Büren channel, built in 1868–75, helped protect the town from flooding and opened up new agricultural land. The cultivation of sugar beets and livestock remain important. During World War II it was the site of the largest refugee camp in Switzerland. The wooden bridge was built in 1821 and replaced in 1991 after a fire 1991. In addition to the district administration, Büren is home to the forestry office, the secondary school, a nursing home and an outpatient hospital care facility.

== Geography ==
Aerial view by Walter Mittelholzer (1932)

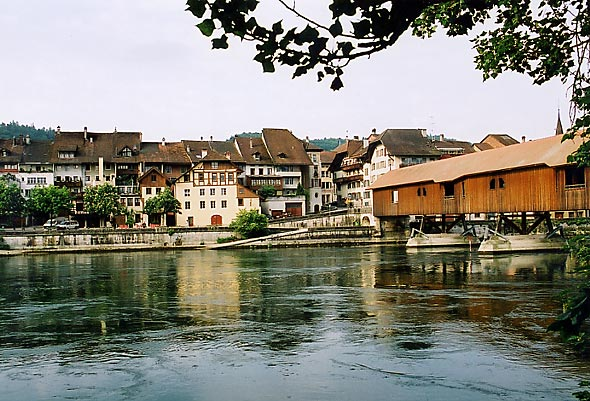
View of Büren an der Aare from the opposite bank of the Aare

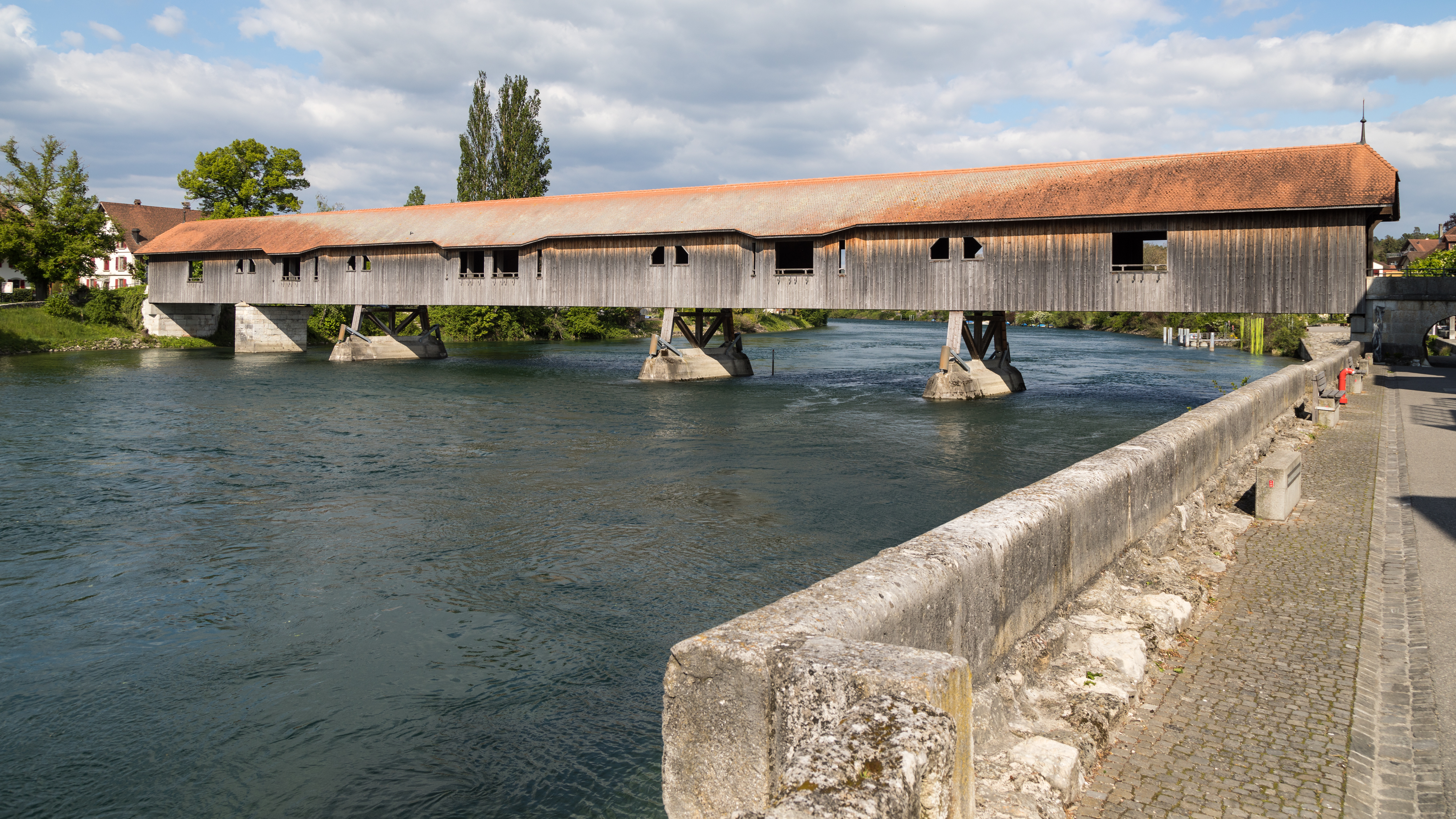
1989/90 rebuilt Aare Bridge

Büren an der Aare had an area, (as of the 2004/09 survey) of 12.6 km^{2} (4.86 sq mi). Of this area, about 46.2% is used for agricultural purposes, while 34.4% is forested. Of the rest of the land, 11.7% is settled (buildings or roads) and 7.6% is unproductive land. Of the unproductive land, 0.89 km^{2} (0.34 mi^{2}) or 7.1% is either rivers or lakes and 0.07 km^{2} (17 acres) or 0.6% is unproductive land. Over the past two decades (1979/85-2004/09) the amount of land that is settled has increased by 22 ha (54 acres) and the agricultural land has decreased by 22 ha (54 acres).

Of the built up area, housing and buildings made up 7.0% and transportation infrastructure made up 3.3%. Out of the forested land, 32.9% of the total land area is heavily forested and 1.6% is covered with orchards or small clusters of trees. Of the agricultural land, 40.2% is used for growing crops and 5.1% is pastures, while 1.1% is used for orchards or vine crops. Of the water in the municipality, 3.9% is in lakes and 3.2% is in rivers and streams.

The municipality is located on the right bank of the Aare, while the formerly independent village of Reiben is on the left bank. It consists of the town of Büren an der Aare, the surrounding agricultural villages of Scheuren, Gummen and Oberbüren, the new developments of Rütifeld and Ziegelei (Gewerbezone), scattered farm houses and since 1911 Reiben.

On 31 December 2009 Amtsbezirk Büren, the municipality's former district, was dissolved. On the following day, 1 January 2010, it joined the newly created Verwaltungskreis Seeland.

== Coat of arms ==
The blazon of the municipal coat of arms is Gules a Bear paw Argent issuant from chief sinister.

== Demographics ==
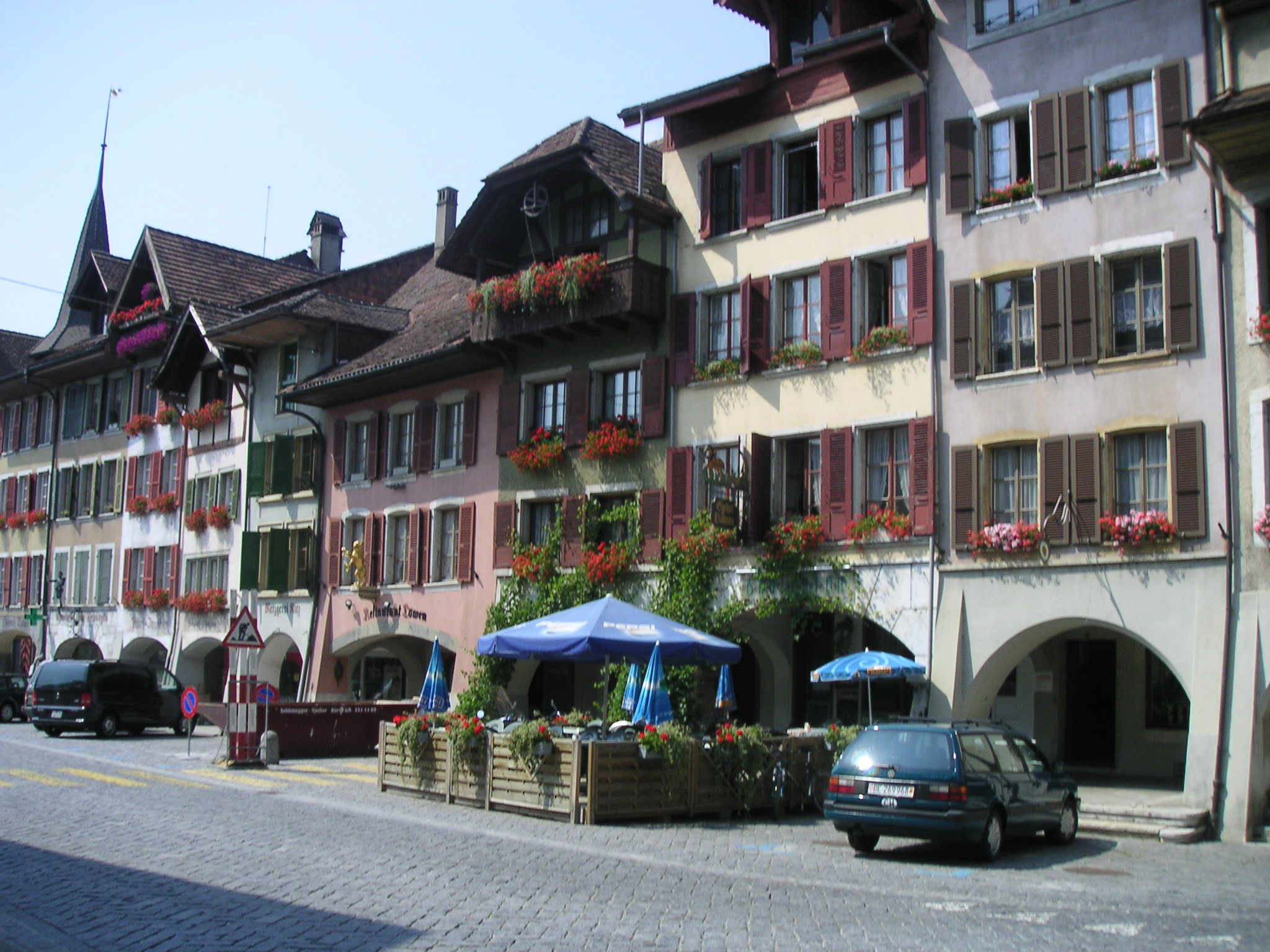
Houses in the old town of Büren

Büren an der Aare has a population (as of December 2020) of 3,622. As of 2014, 16.6% of the population are resident foreign nationals. Over the last 4 years (2010-2014) the population has changed at a rate of 5.93%. The birth rate in the municipality, in 2014, was 8.7, while the death rate was 9.9 per thousand residents.

As of 2014, children and teenagers (0–19 years old) make up 20.9% of the population, while adults (20–64 years old) are 61.3% and seniors (over 64 years old) make up 17.8%. In 2015 there were 1,500 single residents, 1,532 people who were married or in a civil partnership, 199 widows or widowers and 306 divorced residents.

In 2014 there were 1,539 private households in Büren an der Aare with an average household size of 2.20 persons. Of the 733 inhabited buildings in the municipality, in 2000, about 54.8% were single family homes and 19.5% were multiple family buildings. Additionally, about 23.1% of the buildings were built before 1919, while 11.1% were built between 1991 and 2000. In 2013 the rate of construction of new housing units per 1000 residents was 1.45. The vacancy rate for the municipality, in 2015, was 1.14%. As of 2000, there were 445 households that consist of only one person and 70 households with five or more people. In 2000, a total of 1,279 apartments (89.3% of the total) were permanently occupied, while 92 apartments (6.4%) were seasonally occupied and 62 apartments (4.3%) were empty.

Most of the population (as of 2000) speaks German (2,800 or 91.0%) as their first language, Italian is the second most common (51 or 1.7%) and French is the third (38 or 1.2%). There are 2 people who speak Romansh.

As of 2008, the population was 49.1% male and 50.9% female. The population was made up of 1,359 Swiss men (41.8% of the population) and 238 (7.3%) non-Swiss men. There were 1,457 Swiss women (44.8%) and 19 (0.6%) non-Swiss women. Of the population in the municipality, 999 or about 32.5% were born in Büren an der Aare and lived there in 2000. There were 986 or 32.0% who were born in the same canton, while 553 or 18.0% were born somewhere else in Switzerland, and 374 or 12.2% were born outside of Switzerland.

The historical population is given in the following chart:

== Notable people ==
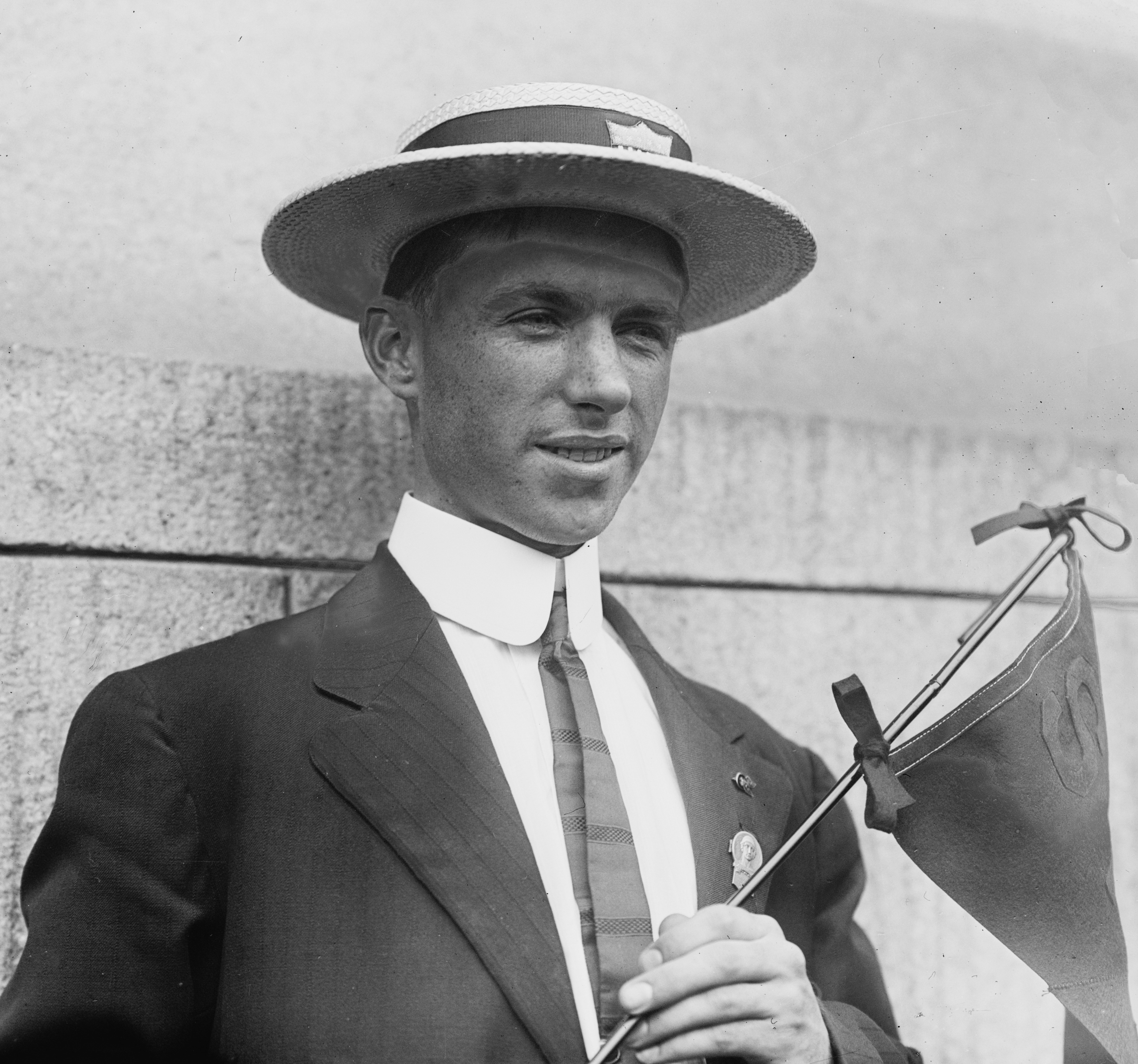
Gaston Strobino

- Prof. Bernhard Studer (1794 in Büren an der Aare – 1887) a 19th-century Swiss geologist
- Ernst Pflüger (1846 in Büren an der Aare – 1903) a Swiss ophthalmologist
- Gaston Strobino (1891 in Büren an der Aare – 1969) an American athlete, bronze medallist in the marathon at the 1912 Summer Olympics
- Markus Raetz (born 1941) a Swiss painter, illustrator and sculptor

== Heritage sites of national significance ==
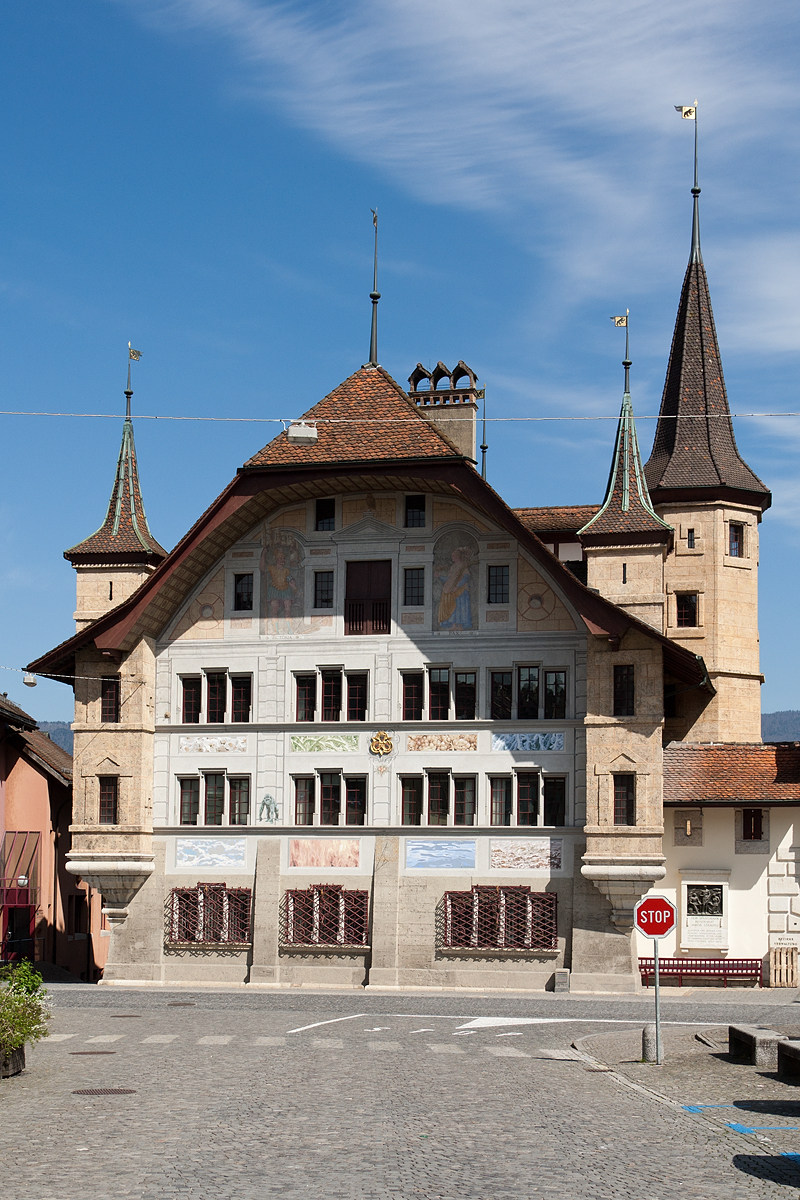
Büren Castle built as the official residence of the Bernese bailiff.

Büren Castle is listed as a Swiss heritage site of national significance. The entire old town of Büren an der Aare is part of the Inventory of Swiss Heritage Sites.

== Politics ==
In the 2015 federal election the most popular party was the SVP with 36.1% of the vote. The next three most popular parties were the SP (16.6%), the BDP (15.4%) and the FDP (10.1%). In the federal election, a total of 1,164 votes were cast, and the voter turnout was 47.6%.

In the 2011 federal election the most popular party was the SVP which received 28.7% of the vote. The next three most popular parties were the BDP Party (19.1%), the SPS (18.3%) and the FDP (9.5%). In the federal election, a total of 1,136 votes were cast, and the voter turnout was 47.4%.

== Economy ==
As of 2013, there were a total of 1,893 people employed in the municipality. Of these, a total of 112 people worked in 32 businesses in the primary economic sector. In 2014 the primary sector numbers had increased by 165 and remained constant respectively. A minority (30.0% of the primary sector employees worked in very small businesses (less than ten employees). There was one small business with a total of 30 employees and one mid sized business with a total of 164 employees. The secondary sector employed 1,048 workers in 55 separate businesses. In 2014 the secondary sector numbers had decreased by 157 and increased by 1 respectively. A minority (19.6% of the secondary sector employees worked in very small businesses. There were 7 small businesses with a total of 250 employees and 3 mid sized businesses with a total of 466 employees. Finally, the tertiary sector provided 733 jobs in 182 businesses. In 2014 the tertiary sector numbers had decreased by 9 and 8 respectively. A majority (61.3% of the tertiary sector employees worked in very small businesses. There were 7 small businesses with a total of 194 employees and one mid sized business with a total of 86 employees. In 2014 a total of 1.5% of the population received social assistance.

In 2008 there were a total of 1,540 full-time equivalent jobs. The number of jobs in the primary sector was 68, of which 65 were in agriculture and 3 were in forestry or lumber production. The number of jobs in the secondary sector was 912 of which 771 or (84.5%) were in manufacturing and 132 (14.5%) were in construction. The number of jobs in the tertiary sector was 560. In the tertiary sector; 122 or 21.8% were in wholesale or retail sales or the repair of motor vehicles, 41 or 7.3% were in the movement and storage of goods, 76 or 13.6% were in a hotel or restaurant, 16 or 2.9% were the insurance or financial industry, 87 or 15.5% were technical professionals or scientists, 28 or 5.0% were in education and 84 or 15.0% were in health care.

In 2000, there were 881 workers who commuted into the municipality and 993 workers who commuted away. The municipality is a net exporter of workers, with about 1.1 workers leaving the municipality for every one entering. Of the working population, 13.9% used public transportation to get to work, and 51.5% used a private car.

== Religion ==
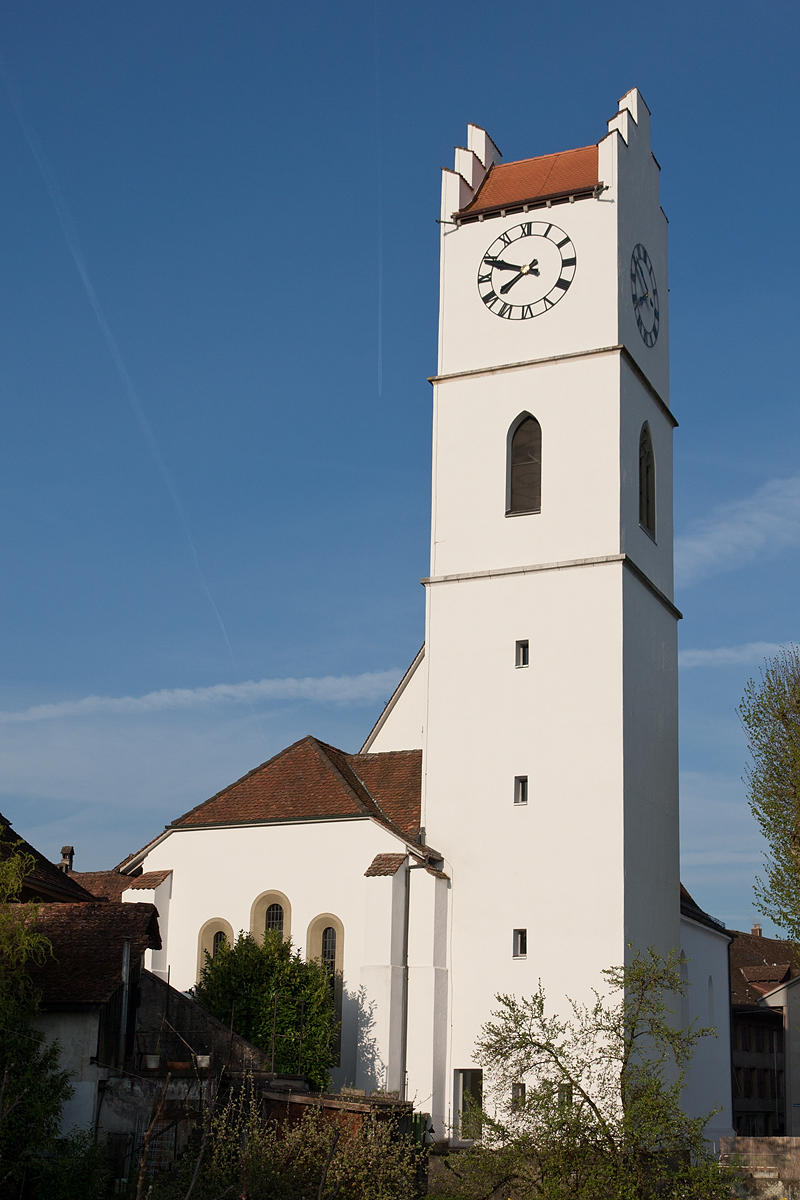
Büren's town church

From the 2000 census, 419 or 13.6% were Roman Catholic, while 2,123 or 69.0% belonged to the Swiss Reformed Church. Of the rest of the population, there were 25 members of an Orthodox church (or about 0.81% of the population), there were 3 individuals (or about 0.10% of the population) who belonged to the Christian Catholic Church, and there were 203 individuals (or about 6.60% of the population) who belonged to another Christian church. There were 2 individuals (or about 0.06% of the population) who were Jewish, and 78 (or about 2.53% of the population) who were Islamic. There were 5 individuals who were Buddhist, 40 individuals who were Hindu and 1 individual who belonged to another church. 180 (or about 5.85% of the population) belonged to no church, are agnostic or atheist, and 99 individuals (or about 3.22% of the population) did not answer the question.

== Education ==
In Büren an der Aare about 1,275 or (41.4%) of the population have completed non-mandatory upper secondary education, and 349 or (11.3%) have completed additional higher education (either university or a Fachhochschule). Of the 349 who completed tertiary schooling, 72.5% were Swiss men, 19.5% were Swiss women, 5.7% were non-Swiss men and 2.3% were non-Swiss women.

The Canton of Bern school system provides one year of non-obligatory Kindergarten, followed by six years of Primary school. This is followed by three years of obligatory lower Secondary school where the students are separated according to ability and aptitude. Following the lower Secondary students may attend additional schooling or they may enter an apprenticeship.

During the 2009–10 school year, there were a total of 370 students attending classes in Büren an der Aare. There were 3 kindergarten classes with a total of 60 students in the municipality. Of the kindergarten students, 23.3% were permanent or temporary residents of Switzerland (not citizens) and 28.3% have a different mother language than the classroom language. The municipality had 11 primary classes and 207 students. Of the primary students, 16.4% were permanent or temporary residents of Switzerland (not citizens) and 15.9% have a different mother language than the classroom language. During the same year, there were 6 lower secondary classes with a total of 103 students. There were 10.7% who were permanent or temporary residents of Switzerland (not citizens) and 32.0% have a different mother language than the classroom language.

As of 2000, there were 31 students in Büren an der Aare who came from another municipality, while 79 residents attended schools outside the municipality.

Büren an der Aare is home to the Bibliothek Büren library. The library has (as of 2008) 7,765 books or other media, and loaned out 23,671 items in the same year. It was open a total of 144 days with average of 7 hours per week during that year.

== Crime ==
In 2014 the crime rate, of the over 200 crimes listed in the Swiss Criminal Code (running from murder, robbery and assault to accepting bribes and election fraud), in Büren an der Aare was 47 per thousand residents. This rate is about three-fourths of the average rate in the entire country. During the same period, the rate of drug crimes was 4.4 per thousand residents, slightly less than half the national rate.
