= Biezwil =

- Municipality
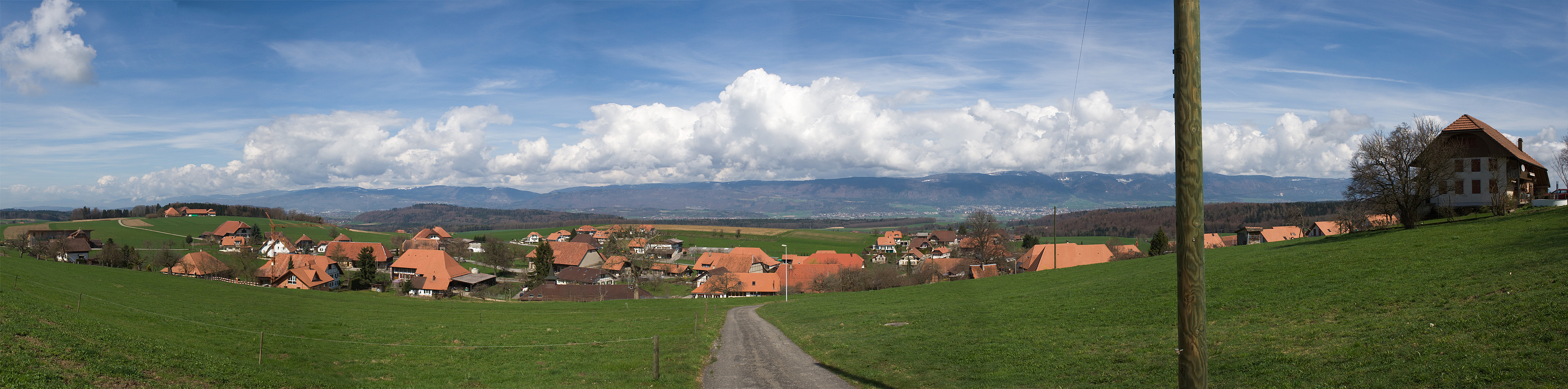

- Coat of arms
- Location of Biezwil
- Location within Switzerland Location within Canton of Solothurn
- Coordinates: 47°7′N 7°25′E
- Country: Switzerland
- Canton: Solothurn
- District: Bucheggberg

Area
  - Total: 4.18 km^{2} (1.61 sq mi)
- Elevation: 586 m (1,923 ft)

Population (December 2020)
  - Total: 344
  - Density: 82.3/km^{2} (213/sq mi)
- Time zone: UTC+01:00 (CET)
  - Summer (DST): UTC+02:00 (CEST)
- Postal code: 4585
- SFOS number: 2445
- ISO 3166 code: CH-SO
- Surrounded by: Balm bei Messen, Lüterswil-Gächliwil, Oberwil bei Büren (BE), Schnottwil
- Website: http://www.biezwil.ch SFSO statistics

Biezwil is a municipality in the district of Bucheggberg, in the canton of Solothurn, Switzerland.

== History ==
Biezwil is first mentioned in 1255 as in Beizwile . In 1276 it was mentioned as zue Biezwile and in 1279 as de Biezwile.

== Geography ==
Biezwil has an area, as of 2009, of 4.18 square kilometers (1.61 sq mi). Of this area, 2.17 km^{2} (0.84 sq mi) or 51.9% is used for agricultural purposes, while 1.73 km^{2} (0.67 sq mi) or 41.4% is forested. Of the rest of the land, 0.28 km^{2} (0.11 sq mi) or 6.7% is settled (buildings or roads).

Of the built up area, housing and buildings made up 4.8% and transportation infrastructure made up 1.9%. Out of the forested land, all of the forested land area is covered with heavy forests. Of the agricultural land, 39.0% is used for growing crops and 11.0% is pastures, while 1.9% is used for orchards or vine crops.

The municipality is located in the Bucheggberg district. It consists of the haufendorf village (an irregular, unplanned and quite closely packed village, built around a central square) of Biezwil and the Aspi, Schoren and Zelgli individual farm houses.

== Coat of arms ==
The blazon of the municipal coat of arms is Gules three Ears Or issuant from a Mount of 3 Coupeaux of the same.

== Demographics ==
Biezwil has a population (as of December 2020) of 344. As of 2008, 3.1% of the population are resident foreign nationals. Over the last 10 years (1999–2009 ) the population has changed at a rate of 18.3%.

Most of the population (as of 2000) speaks German (284 or 98.3%), with French being second most common (4 or 1.4%) and Italian being third (1 or 0.3%).

As of 2008, the gender distribution of the population was 49.2% male and 50.8% female. The population was made up of 156 Swiss men (47.1% of the population) and 7 (2.1%) non-Swiss men. There were 165 Swiss women (49.8%) and 3 (0.9%) non-Swiss women. Of the population in the municipality 103 or about 35.6% were born in Biezwil and lived there in 2000. There were 51 or 17.6% who were born in the same canton, while 124 or 42.9% were born somewhere else in Switzerland, and 7 or 2.4% were born outside of Switzerland.

In 2008 there were 6 live births to Swiss citizens and 1 death of a Swiss citizen. Ignoring immigration and emigration, the population of Swiss citizens increased by 5 while the foreign population remained the same. There . At the same time, there . The total Swiss population change in 2008 (from all sources, including moves across municipal borders) was an increase of 9 and the non-Swiss population decreased by 2 people. This represents a population growth rate of 2.2%.

The age distribution, as of 2000, in Biezwil is; 19 children or 6.6% of the population are between 0 and 6 years old and 49 teenagers or 17.0% are between 7 and 19. Of the adult population, 9 people or 3.1% of the population are between 20 and 24 years old. 91 people or 31.5% are between 25 and 44, and 84 people or 29.1% are between 45 and 64. The senior population distribution is 24 people or 8.3% of the population are between 65 and 79 years old and there are 13 people or 4.5% who are over 80.

As of 2000, there were 115 people who were single and never married in the municipality. There were 140 married individuals, 20 widows or widowers and 14 individuals who are divorced.

As of 2000, there were 120 private households in the municipality, and an average of 2.4 persons per household. There were 33 households that consist of only one person and 5 households with five or more people. Out of a total of 123 households that answered this question, 26.8% were households made up of just one person. Of the rest of the households, there are 42 married couples without children, 40 married couples with children There were 4 single parents with a child or children. There was 1 household that was made up of unrelated people and 3 households that were made up of some sort of institution or another collective housing. In 2000 there were 68 single family homes (or 64.8% of the total) out of a total of 105 inhabited buildings. There were 6 multi-family buildings (5.7%), along with 30 multi-purpose buildings that were mostly used for housing (28.6%) and 1 other use buildings (commercial or industrial) that also had some housing (1.0%). Of the single family homes 23 were built before 1919, while 27 were built between 1990 and 2000.

In 2000 there were 125 apartments in the municipality. The most common apartment size was 4 rooms of which there were 40. There were 3 single room apartments and 55 apartments with five or more rooms. Of these apartments, a total of 117 apartments (93.6% of the total) were permanently occupied, while 5 apartments (4.0%) were seasonally occupied and 3 apartments (2.4%) were empty. As of 2009, the construction rate of new housing units was 0 new units per 1000 residents. The vacancy rate for the municipality, in 2010, was 0%.

The historical population is given in the following chart:

== Politics ==
In the 2007 federal election the most popular party was the FDP which received 46.28% of the vote. The next three most popular parties were the SVP (26.28%), the SP (12.79%) and the CVP (6.51%). In the federal election, a total of 126 votes were cast, and the voter turnout was 51.2%.

== Economy ==
As of 2010, Biezwil had an unemployment rate of 1.7%. As of 2008, there were 41 people employed in the primary economic sector and about 13 businesses involved in this sector. 15 people were employed in the secondary sector and there were 2 businesses in this sector. 14 people were employed in the tertiary sector, with 5 businesses in this sector. There were 180 residents of the municipality who were employed in some capacity, of which females made up 40.0% of the workforce.

In 2008 the total number of full-time equivalent jobs was 49. The number of jobs in the primary sector was 23, all of which were in agriculture. The number of jobs in the secondary sector was 14, all of which were in construction. The number of jobs in the tertiary sector was 12. In the tertiary sector; 1 was in a hotel or restaurant, 9 or 75.0% were technical professionals or scientists, and 1 was in health care.

In 2000, there were 19 workers who commuted into the municipality and 134 workers who commuted away. The municipality is a net exporter of workers, with about 7.1 workers leaving the municipality for every one entering. Of the working population, 6.7% used public transportation to get to work, and 65.6% used a private car.

== Religion ==
From the 2000 census, 29 or 10.0% were Roman Catholic, while 222 or 76.8% belonged to the Swiss Reformed Church. Of the rest of the population, and there were 3 individuals (or about 1.04% of the population) who belonged to another Christian church. There was 1 individual who was Islamic. 27 (or about 9.34% of the population) belonged to no church, are agnostic or atheist, and 7 individuals (or about 2.42% of the population) did not answer the question.

== Education ==
In Biezwil about 116 or (40.1%) of the population have completed non-mandatory upper secondary education, and 41 or (14.2%) have completed additional higher education (either university or a Fachhochschule). Of the 41 who completed tertiary schooling, 73.2% were Swiss men, 24.4% were Swiss women.

As of 2000, there were 8 students in Biezwil who came from another municipality, while 41 residents attended schools outside the municipality.
