= Gossliwil =

- Former municipality
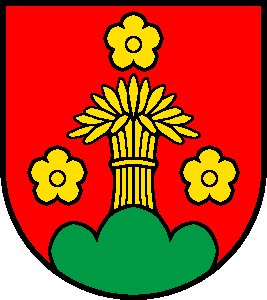
- Coat of arms
- Location of Gossliwil
- Location within Switzerland Location within Canton of Solothurn
- Coordinates: 47°8′N 7°26′E
- Country: Switzerland
- Canton: Solothurn
- District: Bucheggberg

Area
  - Total: 1.94 km^{2} (0.75 sq mi)
- Elevation: 539 m (1,768 ft)

Population (Dec 2011)
  - Total: 194
  - Density: 100/km^{2} (259/sq mi)
- Time zone: UTC+01:00 (CET)
  - Summer (DST): UTC+02:00 (CEST)
- Postal code: 4579
- SFOS number: 2449
- ISO 3166 code: CH-SO
- Surrounded by: Bibern, Hessigkofen, Lüterswil-Gächliwil, Oberwil bei Büren (BE), Rüti bei Büren (BE)
- Website: www.buchegg-so.ch

Gossliwil is a former municipality in the district of Bucheggberg, in the canton of Solothurn, Switzerland. On 1 January 2014 the former municipalities of Gossliwil, Tscheppach, Brügglen, Aetingen, Aetigkofen, Bibern (SO), Hessigkofen, Mühledorf (SO), Küttigkofen, Kyburg-Buchegg merged into the new municipality of Buchegg.

== History ==
Gossliwil is first mentioned in 1246 as Gosseriswile. In 1276 it was mentioned as Goselwyl.

== Geography ==
Before the merger, Gossliwil had a total area of 2.0 km^{2} (0.77 mi^{2}). Of this area, 1.16 km^{2} (0.45 sq mi) or 59.8% is used for agricultural purposes, while 0.66 km^{2} (0.25 sq mi) or 34.0% is forested. Of the rest of the land, 0.15 km^{2} (37 acres) or 7.7% is settled (buildings or roads).

Of the built up area, housing and buildings made up 3.6% and transportation infrastructure made up 4.1%. Out of the forested land, all of the forested land area is covered with heavy forests. Of the agricultural land, 41.2% is used for growing crops and 17.5% is pastures.

The former municipality is located in the Bucheggberg district, on a plateau near the source of the Biberenbach river.

== Coat of arms ==
The blazon of the municipal coat of arms is Gules a Garb Or issuant from a Mount of 3 Coupeaux Vert surrounded with three Cinquefoils of the second, one and two.

== Demographics ==
Gossliwil had a population (as of 2011) of 194. As of 2008, 1.5% of the population are resident foreign nationals. Over the last 10 years (1999–2009 ) the population has changed at a rate of -1.5%.

Most of the population (as of 2000) speaks German (183 or 97.3%), with Albanian being second most common (4 or 2.1%) and Portuguese being third (1 or 0.5%).

As of 2008, the gender distribution of the population was 49.7% male and 50.3% female. The population was made up of 96 Swiss men (49.2% of the population) and 1 (0.5%) non-Swiss men. There were 97 Swiss women (49.7%) and 1 (0.5%) non-Swiss women. Of the population in the municipality 78 or about 41.5% were born in Gossliwil and lived there in 2000. There were 34 or 18.1% who were born in the same canton, while 65 or 34.6% were born somewhere else in Switzerland, and 8 or 4.3% were born outside of Switzerland.

In 2008 there was 1 live birth to Swiss citizens and 1 death of a Swiss citizen. Ignoring immigration and emigration, the population of Swiss citizens remained the same and the foreign population remained the same. There was 1 Swiss man who immigrated back to Switzerland. The total Swiss population change in 2008 (from all sources, including moves across municipal borders) was an increase of 4 and the non-Swiss population remained the same. This represents a population growth rate of 2.0%.

The age distribution, as of 2000, in Gossliwil is; 22 children or 11.7% of the population are between 0 and 6 years old and 25 teenagers or 13.3% are between 7 and 19. Of the adult population, 10 people or 5.3% of the population are between 20 and 24 years old. 60 people or 31.9% are between 25 and 44, and 39 people or 20.7% are between 45 and 64. The senior population distribution is 24 people or 12.8% of the population are between 65 and 79 years old and there are 8 people or 4.3% who are over 80.

As of 2000, there were 79 people who were single and never married in the municipality. There were 94 married individuals, 8 widows or widowers and 7 individuals who are divorced.

In 2000 there were 19 single family homes (or 35.2% of the total) out of a total of 54 inhabited buildings. There were 14 multi-family buildings (25.9%), along with 19 multi-purpose buildings that were mostly used for housing (35.2%) and 2 other use buildings (commercial or industrial) that also had some housing (3.7%).

In 2000 there were 85 apartments in the municipality. Of these apartments, a total of 74 apartments (87.1% of the total) were permanently occupied, while 7 apartments (8.2%) were seasonally occupied and 4 apartments (4.7%) were empty. As of 2009, the construction rate of new housing units was 0 new units per 1000 residents. The vacancy rate for the municipality, in 2010, was 0%.

The historical population is given in the following chart:

== Politics ==
In the 2007 federal election the most popular party was the SVP which received 37.3% of the vote. The next three most popular parties were the FDP (24.39%), the CVP (15.16%) and the SP (11.89%). In the federal election, a total of 73 votes were cast, and the voter turnout was 49.3%.

== Economy ==
As of 2010, Gossliwil had an unemployment rate of 1.4%. As of 2008, there were 25 people employed in the primary economic sector and about 10 businesses involved in this sector. 2 people were employed in the secondary sector and there were 2 businesses in this sector. 6 people were employed in the tertiary sector, with 2 businesses in this sector. There were 97 residents of the municipality who were employed in some capacity, of which females made up 42.3% of the workforce.

In 2008 the total number of full-time equivalent jobs was 19. The number of jobs in the primary sector was 15, all of which were in agriculture. The number of jobs in the secondary sector was 2 of which 1 was in manufacturing and 1 was in construction. The number of jobs in the tertiary sector was 2. In the tertiary sector; both jobs were in a hotel or restaurant.

In 2000, there were 4 workers who commuted into the municipality and 77 workers who commuted away. The municipality is a net exporter of workers, with about 19.3 workers leaving the municipality for every one entering. Of the working population, 5.2% used public transportation to get to work, and 72.2% used a private car.

== Religion ==
From the 2000 census, 19 or 10.1% were Roman Catholic, while 133 or 70.7% belonged to the Swiss Reformed Church. Of the rest of the population, and there were 3 individuals (or about 1.60% of the population) who belonged to another Christian church. There were 5 (or about 2.66% of the population) who were Islamic. 24 (or about 12.77% of the population) belonged to no church, are agnostic or atheist, and 4 individuals (or about 2.13% of the population) did not answer the question.

== Education ==
In Gossliwil about 68 or (36.2%) of the population have completed non-mandatory upper secondary education, and 27 or (14.4%) have completed additional higher education (either university or a Fachhochschule). Of the 27 who completed tertiary schooling, 70.4% were Swiss men, 29.6% were Swiss women.

As of 2000, there were 6 students in Gossliwil who came from another municipality, while 20 residents attended schools outside the municipality.
