= Schnottwil =

- Municipality
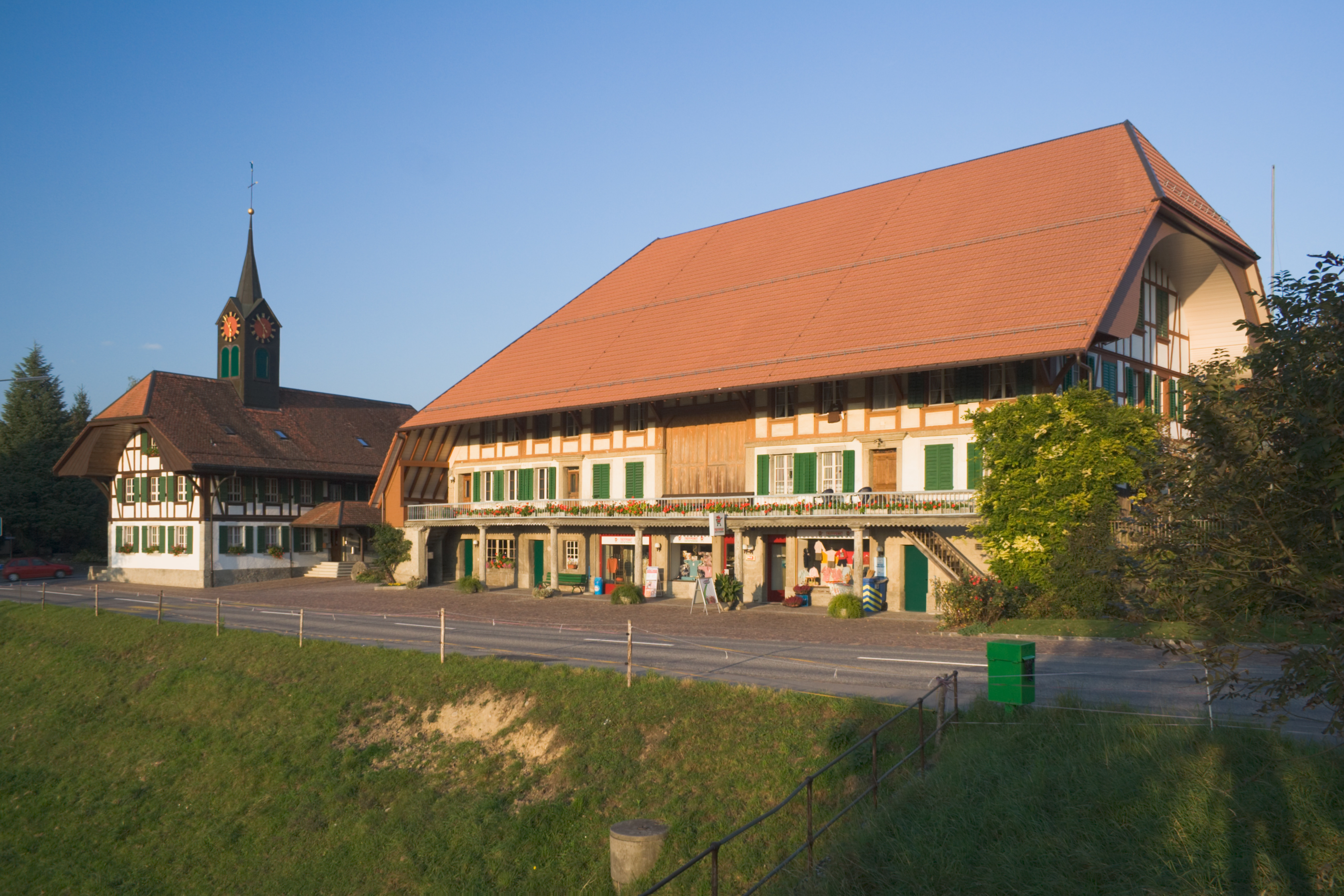
- Schnottwil village

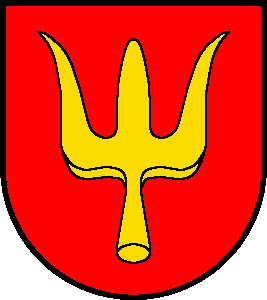
- Coat of arms
- Location of Schnottwil
- Location within Switzerland Location within Canton of Solothurn
- Coordinates: 47°7′N 7°23′E
- Country: Switzerland
- Canton: Solothurn
- District: Bucheggberg

Area
  - Total: 7.18 km^{2} (2.77 sq mi)
- Elevation: 502 m (1,647 ft)

Population (December 2020)
  - Total: 1,135
  - Density: 158/km^{2} (409/sq mi)
- Time zone: UTC+01:00 (CET)
  - Summer (DST): UTC+02:00 (CEST)
- Postal code: 3253
- SFOS number: 2461
- ISO 3166 code: CH-SO
- Surrounded by: Balm bei Messen, Biezwil, Büren an der Aare (BE), Diessbach bei Büren (BE), Oberwil bei Büren (BE), Wengi (BE)
- Website: www.schnottwil.ch

Schnottwil is a municipality in the district of Bucheggberg, in the canton of Solothurn, Switzerland.

== History ==
Schnottwil is first mentioned in 1264 as Snotenwiler mansus and as Snotenwilere molendinum, though both come from a 15th Century copy of the original. In 1398 it was mentioned as Schnottwil.

== Geography ==
Schnottwil has an area, as of 2009, of 7.18 square kilometers (2.77 sq mi). Of this area, 4.23 km^{2} (1.63 sq mi) or 58.9% is used for agricultural purposes, while 2.31 km^{2} (0.89 sq mi) or 32.2% is forested. Of the rest of the land, 0.62 km^{2} (0.24 sq mi) or 8.6% is settled (buildings or roads), 0.01 km^{2} (2.5 acres) or 0.1% is either rivers or lakes.

Of the built up area, housing and buildings made up 5.3% and transportation infrastructure made up 2.5%. Out of the forested land, all of the forested land area is covered with heavy forests. Of the agricultural land, 48.5% is used for growing crops and 9.6% is pastures. All the water in the municipality is flowing water.

The municipality is located in the Bucheggberg district. It is located on the western edge of the canton and is surrounded on three sides by the canton of Bern.

== Coat of arms ==
The blazon of the municipal coat of arms is Gules a Trident Top Or.

== Demographics ==
Schnottwil has a population (as of December 2020) of 1,135. As of 2008, 3.7% of the population are resident foreign nationals. Over the last 10 years (1999–2009 ) the population has changed at a rate of 8.9%.

Most of the population (as of 2000) speaks German (905 or 95.7%), with French being second most common (12 or 1.3%) and Arabic being third (8 or 0.8%). There are 2 people who speak Romansh.

As of 2008, the gender distribution of the population was 49.1% male and 50.9% female. The population was made up of 480 Swiss men (46.5% of the population) and 27 (2.6%) non-Swiss men. There were 509 Swiss women (49.3%) and 17 (1.6%) non-Swiss women. Of the population in the municipality 348 or about 36.8% were born in Schnottwil and lived there in 2000. There were 113 or 11.9% who were born in the same canton, while 388 or 41.0% were born somewhere else in Switzerland, and 65 or 6.9% were born outside of Switzerland.

In 2008 there were 14 live births to Swiss citizens and were 5 deaths of Swiss citizens. Ignoring immigration and emigration, the population of Swiss citizens increased by 9 while the foreign population remained the same. There was 1 Swiss man and 1 Swiss woman who emigrated from Switzerland. At the same time, there were 3 non-Swiss men and 2 non-Swiss women who immigrated from another country to Switzerland. The total Swiss population change in 2008 (from all sources, including moves across municipal borders) was an increase of 20 and the non-Swiss population increased by 7 people. This represents a population growth rate of 2.7%.

The age distribution, as of 2000, in Schnottwil is; 95 children or 10.0% of the population are between 0 and 6 years old and 140 teenagers or 14.8% are between 7 and 19. Of the adult population, 60 people or 6.3% of the population are between 20 and 24 years old. 340 people or 35.9% are between 25 and 44, and 207 people or 21.9% are between 45 and 64. The senior population distribution is 88 people or 9.3% of the population are between 65 and 79 years old and there are 16 people or 1.7% who are over 80.

As of 2000, there were 413 people who were single and never married in the municipality. There were 462 married individuals, 35 widows or widowers and 36 individuals who are divorced.

As of 2000, there were 371 private households in the municipality, and an average of 2.5 persons per household. There were 88 households that consist of only one person and 31 households with five or more people. Out of a total of 376 households that answered this question, 23.4% were households made up of just one person and there were 2 adults who lived with their parents. Of the rest of the households, there are 120 married couples without children, 142 married couples with children There were 17 single parents with a child or children. There were 2 households that were made up of unrelated people and 5 households that were made up of some sort of institution or another collective housing.

In 2000 there were 161 single family homes (or 60.1% of the total) out of a total of 268 inhabited buildings. There were 44 multi-family buildings (16.4%), along with 54 multi-purpose buildings that were mostly used for housing (20.1%) and 9 other use buildings (commercial or industrial) that also had some housing (3.4%). Of the single family homes 30 were built before 1919, while 54 were built between 1990 and 2000. The greatest number of single family homes (32) were built between 1991 and 1995.

In 2000 there were 380 apartments in the municipality. The most common apartment size was 4 rooms of which there were 115. There were 4 single room apartments and 170 apartments with five or more rooms. Of these apartments, a total of 358 apartments (94.2% of the total) were permanently occupied, while 12 apartments (3.2%) were seasonally occupied and 10 apartments (2.6%) were empty. As of 2009, the construction rate of new housing units was 3.9 new units per 1000 residents. The vacancy rate for the municipality, in 2010, was 0%.

The historical population is given in the following chart:

== Politics ==
In the 2007 federal election the most popular party was the FDP which received 37.83% of the vote. The next three most popular parties were the SVP (27%), the SP (15.67%) and the Green Party (7.8%). In the federal election, a total of 381 votes were cast, and the voter turnout was 48.0%.

== Economy ==
As of 2010, Schnottwil had an unemployment rate of 1.8%. As of 2008, there were 61 people employed in the primary economic sector and about 28 businesses involved in this sector. 128 people were employed in the secondary sector and there were 15 businesses in this sector. 110 people were employed in the tertiary sector, with 25 businesses in this sector. There were 556 residents of the municipality who were employed in some capacity, of which females made up 43.9% of the workforce.

In 2008 the total number of full-time equivalent jobs was 232. The number of jobs in the primary sector was 36, all of which were in agriculture. The number of jobs in the secondary sector was 118 of which 39 or (33.1%) were in manufacturing and 79 (66.9%) were in construction. The number of jobs in the tertiary sector was 78. In the tertiary sector; 19 or 24.4% were in wholesale or retail sales or the repair of motor vehicles, 6 or 7.7% were in the movement and storage of goods, 9 or 11.5% were in a hotel or restaurant, 2 or 2.6% were the insurance or financial industry, 10 or 12.8% were technical professionals or scientists, 25 or 32.1% were in education and 2 or 2.6% were in health care.

In 2000, there were 91 workers who commuted into the municipality and 416 workers who commuted away. The municipality is a net exporter of workers, with about 4.6 workers leaving the municipality for every one entering. Of the working population, 12.1% used public transportation to get to work, and 65.5% used a private car.

== Religion ==
From the 2000 census, 97 or 10.3% were Roman Catholic, while 737 or 77.9% belonged to the Swiss Reformed Church. Of the rest of the population, there were 4 members of an Orthodox church (or about 0.42% of the population), there was 1 individual who belongs to the Christian Catholic Church, and there were 15 individuals (or about 1.59% of the population) who belonged to another Christian church. There were 5 (or about 0.53% of the population) who were Islamic. There were 2 individuals who were Buddhist and 1 individual who belonged to another church. 59 (or about 6.24% of the population) belonged to no church, are agnostic or atheist, and 25 individuals (or about 2.64% of the population) did not answer the question.

== Education ==
In Schnottwil about 390 or (41.2%) of the population have completed non-mandatory upper secondary education, and 144 or (15.2%) have completed additional higher education (either university or a Fachhochschule). Of the 144 who completed tertiary schooling, 70.1% were Swiss men, 25.7% were Swiss women.

As of 2000, there were 93 students in Schnottwil who came from another municipality, while 28 residents attended schools outside the municipality.
