= Ernst Pflüger =

Swiss ophthalmologist

Ernst Pflüger (1 July 1846, in Büren an der Aare – 30 September 1903, in Bern) was a Swiss ophthalmologist.

In 1870 he received his medical doctorate at the University of Bern, then furthered his education in ophthalmology at Utrecht University with Franciscus Donders and at the University of Vienna with Carl Ferdinand von Arlt. Afterwards, he worked as an eye doctor in Lucerne, and in 1876 became an associate professor and successor to Henri Dor at the University of Bern. From 1879 up until his death in 1903, he was a full professor of ophthalmology at the university.

From 1882 to 1896 he developed optotypes for the testing of vision. He also made contributions in the areas of retinoscopy, direct ophthalmoscopy and ophthalmometry. He published around 100 papers on topics such as myopia, glaucoma, color vision, et al.

== Selected works ==
- Beiträge zur Ophthalmotonometrie, 1871 – On the ophthalmic tonometer.
- Tafeln zur Bestimmung der Farbenblindheit, 1880 – Tables for the determination of color blindness.
- Zur Behandlung des Glaukoms, 1882 – On treatment for glaucoma.
- Methode zur Prüfung des Farbensinnes mit Hülfe des Flor-Contrastes, 1882 – Method for testing color sense, etc.
- Optotypi (Sehproben), 1884 – Octotypes.
- Die operative Beseitigung der durchsichtigen Linse, 1900 – The surgical removal of the transparent lens.
