= Rüti bei Büren =

- Municipality
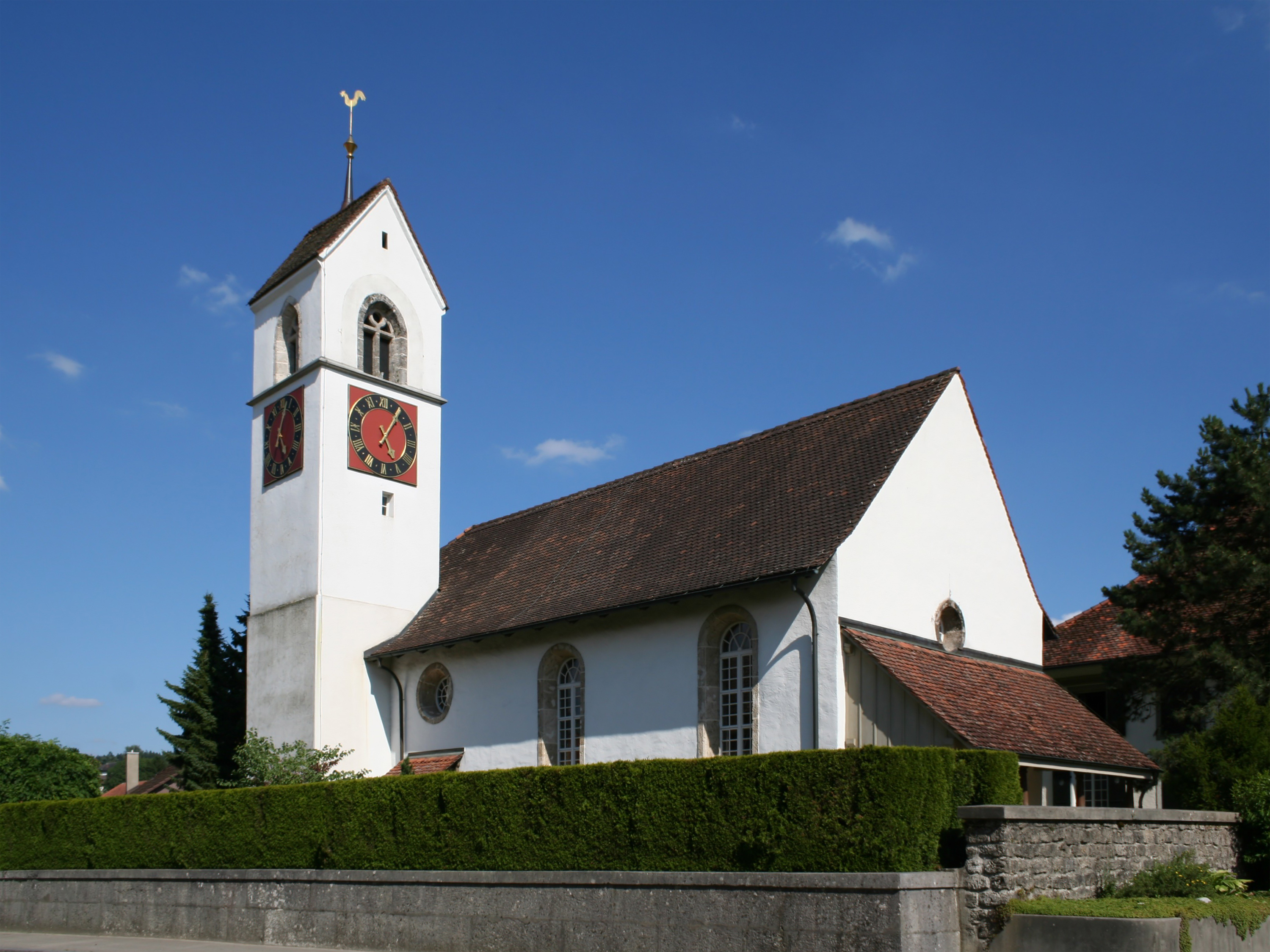
- Rüti bei Büren's Reformed Church

- Flag Coat of arms
- Location of Rüti bei Büren
- Location within Switzerland Location within Canton of Bern
- Coordinates: 47°9′N 7°24′E
- Country: Switzerland
- Canton: Bern
- District: Seeland

Area
  - Total: 6.5 km^{2} (2.5 sq mi)
- Elevation: 437 m (1,434 ft)

Population (December 2020)
  - Total: 867
  - Density: 130/km^{2} (350/sq mi)
- Time zone: UTC+01:00 (CET)
  - Summer (DST): UTC+02:00 (CEST)
- Postal code: 3295
- SFOS number: 393
- ISO 3166 code: CH-BE
- Surrounded by: Grenchen, Arch, Bibern, Gossliwil, Oberwil bei Büren and Büren an der Aare
- Website: www.ruetibeibueren.ch

Rüti bei Büren is a municipality in the Seeland administrative district in the canton of Bern in Switzerland. It is also a reformed church parish.

== History ==
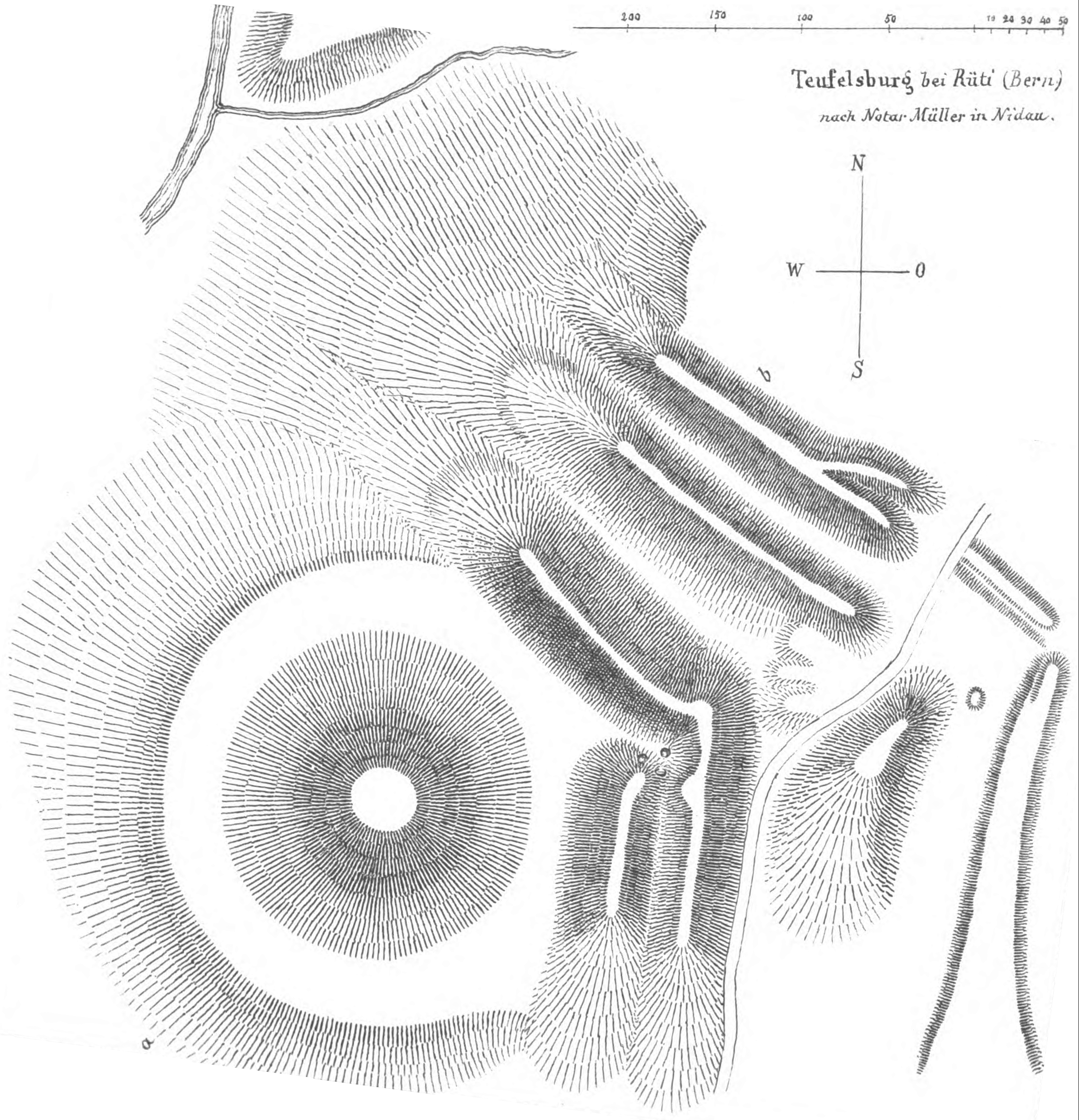
The plan of the Teufelsburg (Devil's Castle) showing the foundation of the central castle and the four outer walls

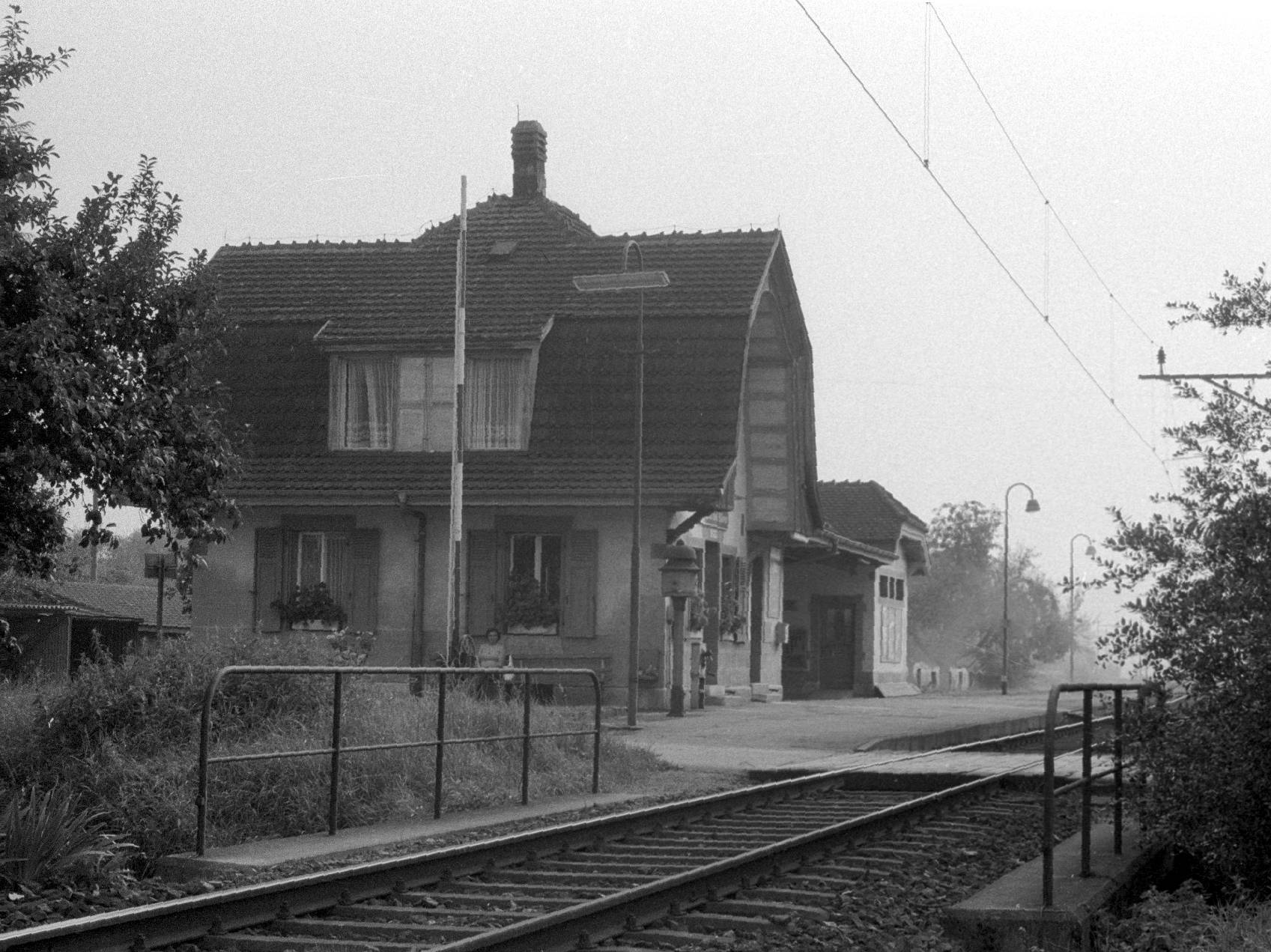
The now abandoned train station of Rüti bei Büren in 1972

Rüti bei Büren is first mentioned in 1185 as in litore Ruthi. In 1257 it was mentioned as Ruti prope Burron.

Scattered neolithic items indicate that there was a small settlement near Rüti bei Büren. Other evidence of prehistoric settlements include; Hallstatt grave mounds at Rütiwald, a Roman era manor at Buchsi and Roman masonry at the church. The Roman road through the Swiss Plateau passed through the modern municipal borders. During the Early and High Middle Ages the Teufelsburg (Devil's Castle) in the Rütiwald stood over the village. The impressive castle had a large ring wall with four outer walls. The castle may have been the home of the Counts of Buchegg. Later, Rüti belonged to the Counts of Strassberg. In 1388, Bern acquired all their land, including Rüti. In 1393 it was assigned to the newly created Büren bailiwick.

The village church of St. Mauritius was first mentioned in 1251. The nave is a Romanesque construction, while the choir is early-Gothic. The church was expanded in 1689. In 1911, the murals from around 1450, were rediscovered and repaired.

Even after the construction of a railroad station on the Solothurn-Lyss rail line in 1912, the village remained small and isolated. Until about 1960 it was a primarily agricultural village with only a few small businesses. The largest factory was a small wooden goods factory. Around 1960 a chemical plant and a watch factory moved into the village. The watch factory employed about 300 people. However, by 1980, the watch making industry was in decline and many workers lost their jobs. By the 2000 census, over 70% of the working population commuted to Büren, Grenchen, Biel, Bern or Solothurn for work.

== Geography ==
Aerial view (1958)

Rüti bei Büren has an area of 6.5 km^{2} (2.51 sq mi). Of this area, 3.19 km^{2} (1.23 mi^{2}) or 49.0% is used for agricultural purposes, while 2.46 km^{2} (0.95 mi^{2}) or 37.8% is forested. Of the rest of the land, 0.62 km^{2} (0.24 mi^{2}) or 9.5% is settled (buildings or roads), 0.23 km^{2} (0.089 mi^{2}) or 3.5% is either rivers or lakes.

Of the built up area, housing and buildings made up 4.8% and transportation infrastructure made up 2.5%. Power and water infrastructure as well as other special developed areas made up 1.1% of the area Out of the forested land, all of the forested land area is covered with heavy forests. Of the agricultural land, 38.1% is used for growing crops and 10.0% is pastures. All the water in the municipality is flowing water.

The municipality is located on the right bank of the Aare river on the north-western edge of the Bucheggberg plateau.

On 31 December 2009 Amtsbezirk Büren, the municipality's former district, was dissolved. On the following day, 1 January 2010, it joined the newly created Verwaltungskreis Seeland.

== Coat of arms ==
The blazon of the municipal coat of arms is Gules two Grubbing-axes Argent handled Or in saltire between two Mullets of five of the second.

== Demographics ==
Rüti bei Büren has a population (as of December 2020) of 867. As of 2010, 4.6% of the population are resident foreign nationals. Over the last 10 years (2000-2010) the population has changed at a rate of -12.7%. Migration accounted for -1.2%, while births and deaths accounted for -4.2%.

Most of the population (as of 2000) speaks German (849 or 94.5%) as their first language, French is the second most common (18 or 2.0%) and Albanian is the third (11 or 1.2%). There are 6 people who speak Italian.

As of 2008, the population was 49.2% male and 50.8% female. The population was made up of 387 Swiss men (46.5% of the population) and 23 (2.8%) non-Swiss men. There were 408 Swiss women (49.0%) and 15 (1.8%) non-Swiss women. Of the population in the municipality, 386 or about 43.0% were born in Rüti bei Büren and lived there in 2000. There were 254 or 28.3% who were born in the same canton, while 157 or 17.5% were born somewhere else in Switzerland, and 66 or 7.3% were born outside of Switzerland.

As of 2010, children and teenagers (0–19 years old) make up 19.6% of the population, while adults (20–64 years old) make up 61.5% and seniors (over 64 years old) make up 19%.

As of 2000, there were 354 people who were single and never married in the municipality. There were 439 married individuals, 60 widows or widowers and 45 individuals who are divorced.

As of 2000, there were 84 households that consist of only one person and 26 households with five or more people. In 2000, a total of 346 apartments (92.5% of the total) were permanently occupied, while 16 apartments (4.3%) were seasonally occupied and 12 apartments (3.2%) were empty. The vacancy rate for the municipality, in 2011, was 1.23%.

The historical population is given in the following chart:

== Heritage sites of national significance ==
The entire village of Rüti bei Büren is part of the Inventory of Swiss Heritage Sites.

== Politics ==
The municipal assembly forms the legislature of the municipality. As of 2005 the executive is a seven-member municipal council, chosen by proportional representation. It was voted in the autumn to reduce the size of the council to five seats and elect by majority.

In the 2011 federal election, the most popular party was the BDP which received 47.8% of the vote. The next three most popular parties were the SVP (23.7%), the SPS (10%) and the Green Party (5.8%). In the federal election, a total of 311 votes were cast, and the voter turnout was 45.5%. The results of this election cycle were likely influenced by Samuel Schmid, a Rüti native and former Swiss President, who was controversially ousted from the SVP and founded the BDP in 2008.

In the 2023 federal election, the most popular party was the SVP (49.5%), followed by the Centre (16.1%), the SPS (11.2%), the GLP (8.8%) and the Green Party (3.9%).

== Economy ==
A business managing chemical waste is located in Rüti. The town gained fame across the country in the 1990s for the company's plans to build a facility for burning hazardous waste. It was eventually abandoned due to resistance from the population. Since then, the factory was updated to recycle industrial waste chemicals and used cooking oil.

Rüti is home to a 500-year old flour mill. First documented in 1523, the mill has been managed by the Eggli family since 1858. The mill continues to process regional grain and supply local bakeries and private customers.

As of 2011, Rüti bei Büren had an unemployment rate of 2.02%. As of 2008, there were a total of 455 people employed in the municipality. Of these, there were 47 people employed in the primary economic sector and about 18 businesses involved in this sector. 138 people were employed in the secondary sector and there were 13 businesses in this sector. 270 people were employed in the tertiary sector, with 20 businesses in this sector.

In 2008 there were a total of 381 full-time equivalent jobs. The number of jobs in the primary sector was 33, all of which were in agriculture. The number of jobs in the secondary sector was 116 of which 99 or (85.3%) were in manufacturing and 16 (13.8%) were in construction. The number of jobs in the tertiary sector was 232. In the tertiary sector; 170 or 73.3% were in wholesale or retail sales or the repair of motor vehicles, 9 or 3.9% were in the movement and storage of goods, 5 or 2.2% were in a hotel or restaurant, 6 or 2.6% were in education and 15 or 6.5% were in health care.

In 2000, there were 156 workers who commuted into the municipality and 329 workers who commuted away. The municipality is a net exporter of workers, with about 2.1 workers leaving the municipality for every one entering. Of the working population, 13% used public transportation to get to work, and 59% used a private car.

== Religion ==
From the 2000 census, 95 or 10.6% were Roman Catholic, while 706 or 78.6% belonged to the Swiss Reformed Church. Of the rest of the population, there was 1 member of an Orthodox church, there was 1 individual who belongs to the Christian Catholic Church, and there were 20 individuals (or about 2.23% of the population) who belonged to another Christian church. There were 20 (or about 2.23% of the population) who were Islamic. There was 1 person who was Buddhist. 40 (or about 4.45% of the population) belonged to no church, are agnostic or atheist, and 24 individuals (or about 2.67% of the population) did not answer the question.

== Education ==
In Rüti bei Büren about 362 or (40.3%) of the population have completed non-mandatory upper secondary education, and 72 or (8.0%) have completed additional higher education (either university or a Fachhochschule). Of the 72 who completed tertiary schooling, 72.2% were Swiss men, 18.1% were Swiss women.

The Canton of Bern school system provides one year of non-obligatory Kindergarten, followed by six years of Primary school. This is followed by three years of obligatory lower Secondary school where the students are separated according to ability and aptitude. Following the lower Secondary students may attend additional schooling or they may enter an apprenticeship.

During the 2009-10 school year, there were a total of 58 students attending classes in Rüti bei Büren. There was one kindergarten class with a total of 13 students in the municipality. The municipality had 3 primary classes and 45 students. Of the primary students, and 4.4% have a different mother language than the classroom language.

As of 2000, there was one student in Rüti bei Büren who came from another municipality, while 58 residents attended schools outside the municipality.

== Notable residents ==
Samuel Schmid (SVP), member of the Swiss Federal Council (2000–2008) and President of the Swiss Confederation in 2005.
