= Bueren Castle =

- Belgium
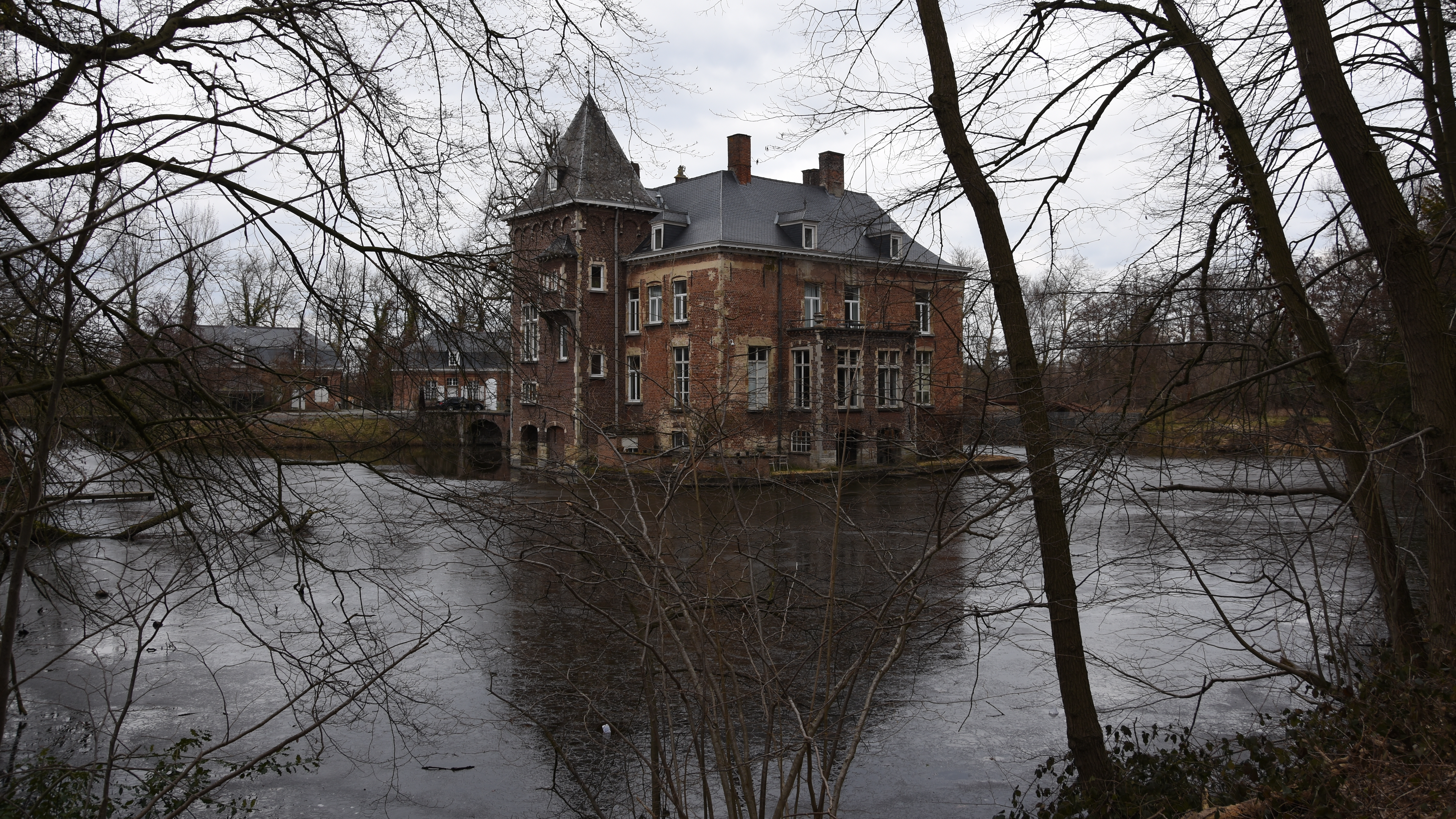

Site information
- Type: Castle

Location
- Coordinates: 50°59′27″N 03°49′28″E

Bueren Castle is a 16th-century moated castle in Melle-Kwatrecht. The castle domain is 10 hectares and is located in two municipalities.

The castle is named after Christophe-Bernard de Bueren, a scion of the Belgian noble family de Bueren.

== History ==
In a lease from 1408 the castle is mentioned as Goed Ter Elst. In 1571 it is described as een aut casteel, while Antoon Sanders depicts it as tHuys van den advot vender Burght on Quaadregt in 't land van Aalst. The castle is surrounded by moats. According to Antoon Sanders, access was gained via a gate facade with an arch bridge to the courtyard with orchard in front of the castle. In front of the bridge over the inner wall stood a tower, probably with a dovecote. A drawbridge closed off the entrance to the castle. The octagonal stair tower has also disappeared. The current castle is built in Renaissance style. It was slightly modified in the 18th century and then modified and enlarged at the end of the 19th century with the replacement of the entrance bay and addition of the heavy corner tower (south-west) in the Neo-Renaissance style.

At the entrance bridge to the castle park there are two similar pavilions, a coach house, a horse stable and a staff residence. Each building was constructed with an octagonal Gloriette built against the outer corner. They probably date from the end of the 18th century.

The current bridge and barrier are probably from the 19th century. A plane tree (Kalverhagestraat), the access road to the castle from the Brusselsesteenweg, is now intersected by the Ghent-Mechelen railway from 1837. At the beginning of the plane tree lane is a Gloriette, which was converted into a residence at the end of the 19th century.

== See also ==
- List of castles in Belgium
