= Oberwil bei Büren =

- Municipality
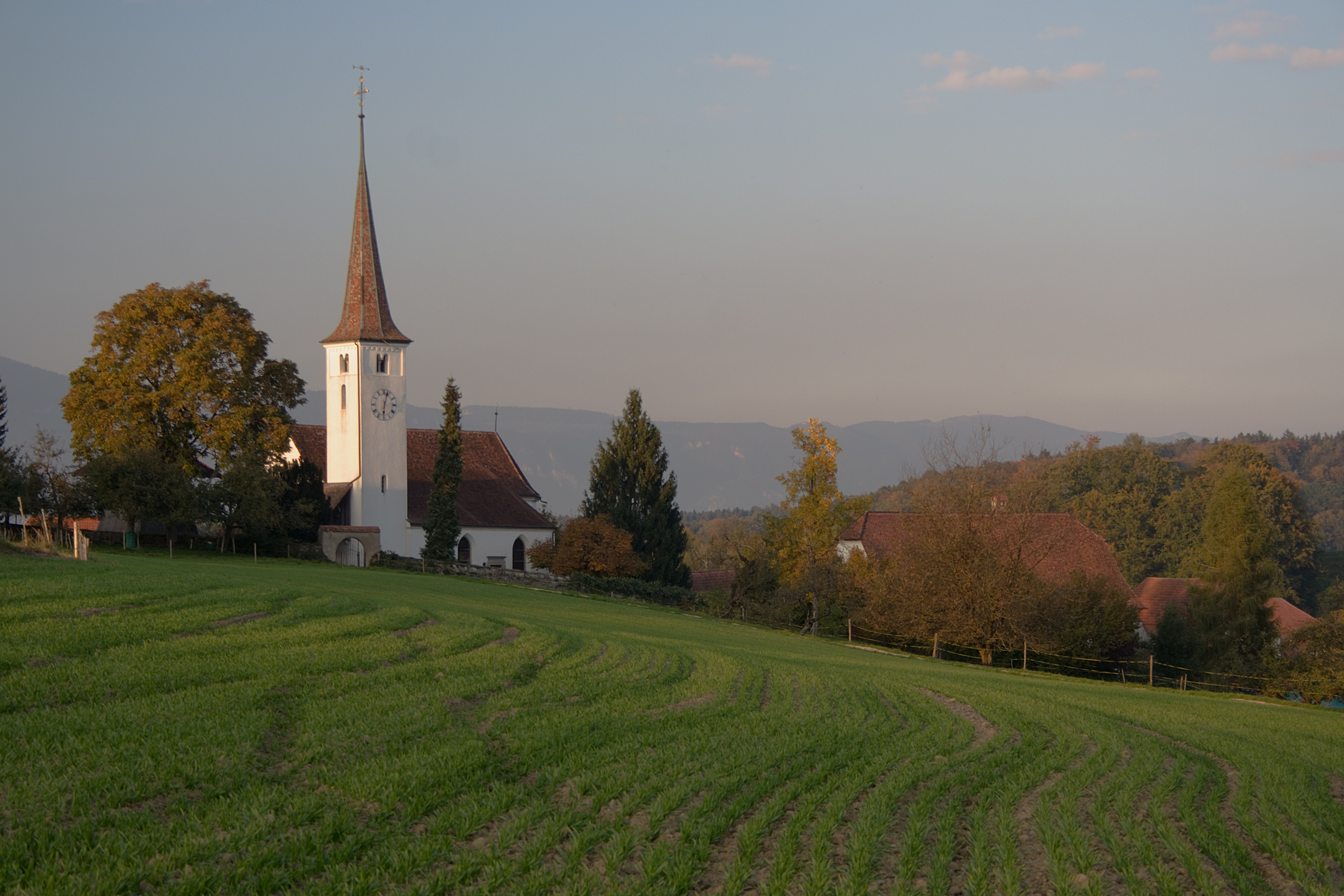
- Oberwil bei Büren village church

- Flag Coat of arms
- Location of Oberwil bei Büren
- Location within Switzerland Location within Canton of Bern
- Coordinates: 47°8′N 7°24′E
- Country: Switzerland
- Canton: Bern
- District: Seeland

Area
  - Total: 6.7 km^{2} (2.6 sq mi)
- Elevation: 488 m (1,601 ft)

Population (December 2020)
  - Total: 887
  - Density: 130/km^{2} (340/sq mi)
- Time zone: UTC+01:00 (CET)
  - Summer (DST): UTC+02:00 (CEST)
- Postal code: 3298
- SFOS number: 391
- ISO 3166 code: CH-BE
- Surrounded by: Biezwil (SO), Büren an der Aare, Gossliwil (SO), Lüterswil-Gächliwil (SO), Rüti bei Büren, Schnottwil (SO)
- Website: oberwil-bueren.ch

Oberwil bei Büren is a municipality in the Seeland administrative district in the canton of Bern in Switzerland.

== History ==
Aerial view (1950)

Oberwil bei Büren is first mentioned in 1236 as Oberwile.

Various neolithic, Bronze Age and Roman items have been found around the municipality. During the Middle Ages it was part of the Strassberg Herrschaft. Between 1388 and 1393, the entire Strassberg lands were acquired by Bern. Oberwil bei Büren became part of the newly created Bernese bailiwick of Büren.

The Church of St. Mauritius was first mentioned in 1275, but it stands on the foundations of earlier churches. The first was an early medieval wooden church from the 7th or 8th century. The first brick church was built on the site in the 9th or 10th century. Four further churches were built before the choir was completely rebuilt in 1506-07. The most recent renovation of the church was in the 17th century.

Throughout its history the village has remained a rural, agricultural place. Since there are very few jobs in the municipality about two-thirds of the working population commute. Many of which have very long commutes to Bern or Zurich.

== Geography ==
Oberwil bei Büren has an area of 6.74 km^{2} (2.60 sq mi). Of this area, 3.76 km^{2} (1.45 mi^{2}) or 56.0% is used for agricultural purposes, while 2.4 km^{2} (0.93 mi^{2}) or 35.7% is forested. Of the rest of the land, 0.57 km^{2} (0.22 mi^{2}) or 8.5% is settled (buildings or roads).

Of the built up area, housing and buildings made up 4.9% and transportation infrastructure made up 2.8%. Out of the forested land, all of the forested land area is covered with heavy forests. Of the agricultural land, 40.6% is used for growing crops and 14.6% is pastures.

The municipality is located on the western side of the Bucheggberg plateau.

On 31 December 2009 Amtsbezirk Büren, the municipality's former district, was dissolved. On the following day, 1 January 2010, it joined the newly created Verwaltungskreis Seeland.

== Coat of arms ==
The blazon of the municipal coat of arms is Azure a Harrow Or ringed Argent.

== Demographics ==
Oberwil bei Büren has a population (as of December 2020) of 887. As of 2010, 6.3% of the population are resident foreign nationals. Over the last 10 years (2000–2010) the population has changed at a rate of 6.1%. Migration accounted for 3.7%, while births and deaths accounted for 2.8%.

Most of the population (as of 2000) speaks German (750 or 97.9%) as their first language, French is the second most common (7 or 0.9%) and Serbo-Croatian is the third (4 or 0.5%). and 1 person who speaks Romansh.

As of 2008, the population was 50.1% male and 49.9% female. The population was made up of 370 Swiss men (46.3% of the population) and 31 (3.9%) non-Swiss men. There were 380 Swiss women (47.5%) and 19 (2.4%) non-Swiss women. Of the population in the municipality, 293 or about 38.3% were born in Oberwil bei Büren and lived there in 2000. There were 273 or 35.6% who were born in the same canton, while 139 or 18.1% were born somewhere else in Switzerland, and 33 or 4.3% were born outside of Switzerland.

As of 2010, children and teenagers (0–19 years old) make up 21.3% of the population, while adults (20–64 years old) make up 62.8% and seniors (over 64 years old) make up 16%.

As of 2000, there were 294 people who were single and never married in the municipality. There were 390 married individuals, 47 widows or widowers and 35 individuals who are divorced.

As of 2000, there were 84 households that consist of only one person and 17 households with five or more people. In 2000, a total of 310 apartments (93.7% of the total) were permanently occupied, while 9 apartments (2.7%) were seasonally occupied and 12 apartments (3.6%) were empty. As of 2010, the construction rate of new housing units was 2.5 new units per 1000 residents. The vacancy rate for the municipality, in 2011, was 1.06%.

The historical population is given in the following chart:

== Sights ==
The entire village of Oberwil bei Büren is designated as part of the Inventory of Swiss Heritage Sites.

== Politics ==
In the 2011 federal election the most popular party was the SVP which received 40.6% of the vote. The next three most popular parties were the BDP Party (26.7%), the SPS (10.1%) and the Green Party (5.6%). In the federal election, a total of 294 votes were cast, and the voter turnout was 46.7%.

== Economy ==
As of 2011, Oberwil bei Büren had an unemployment rate of 0.67%. As of 2008, there were a total of 198 people employed in the municipality. Of these, there were 73 people employed in the primary economic sector and about 24 businesses involved in this sector. 84 people were employed in the secondary sector and there were 13 businesses in this sector. 41 people were employed in the tertiary sector, with 19 businesses in this sector.

In 2008 there were a total of 159 full-time equivalent jobs. The number of jobs in the primary sector was 50, of which 47 were in agriculture and 3 were in forestry or lumber production. The number of jobs in the secondary sector was 77 of which 57 or (74.0%) were in manufacturing, 13 or (16.9%) were in mining and 8 (10.4%) were in construction. The number of jobs in the tertiary sector was 32. In the tertiary sector; 5 or 15.6% were in wholesale or retail sales or the repair of motor vehicles, 10 or 31.3% were in a hotel or restaurant, 1 was in the information industry, 1 was a technical professional or scientist, 4 or 12.5% were in education.

In 2000, there were 65 workers who commuted into the municipality and 330 workers who commuted away. The municipality is a net exporter of workers, with about 5.1 workers leaving the municipality for every one entering. Of the working population, 8.8% used public transportation to get to work, and 61.3% used a private car.

== Religion ==
From the 2000 census, 35 or 4.6% were Roman Catholic, while 651 or 85.0% belonged to the Swiss Reformed Church. Of the rest of the population, there were 2 individuals (or about 0.26% of the population) who belonged to the Christian Catholic Church, and there were 30 individuals (or about 3.92% of the population) who belonged to another Christian church. There were 8 (or about 1.04% of the population) who were Islamic. There were 3 individuals who were Buddhist. 33 (or about 4.31% of the population) belonged to no church, are agnostic or atheist, and 19 individuals (or about 2.48% of the population) did not answer the question.

== Education ==
In Oberwil bei Büren about 333 or (43.5%) of the population have completed non-mandatory upper secondary education, and 83 or (10.8%) have completed additional higher education (either university or a Fachhochschule). Of the 83 who completed tertiary schooling, 81.9% were Swiss men, 14.5% were Swiss women.

The Canton of Bern school system provides one year of non-obligatory Kindergarten, followed by six years of Primary school. This is followed by three years of obligatory lower Secondary school where the students are separated according to ability and aptitude. Following the lower Secondary students may attend additional schooling or they may enter an apprenticeship.

During the 2009-10 school year, there were a total of 75 students attending classes in Oberwil bei Büren. There was one kindergarten class with a total of 15 students in the municipality. Of the kindergarten students, 6.7% were permanent or temporary residents of Switzerland (not citizens). The municipality had 3 primary classes and 60 students. Of the primary students, 3.3% were permanent or temporary residents of Switzerland (not citizens).

As of 2000, there was one student in Oberwil bei Büren who came from another municipality, while 28 residents attended schools outside the municipality.
