= Büren Castle =

Castle in Büren an der Aare, Switzerland

- Schloss Büren
- Büren an der Aare
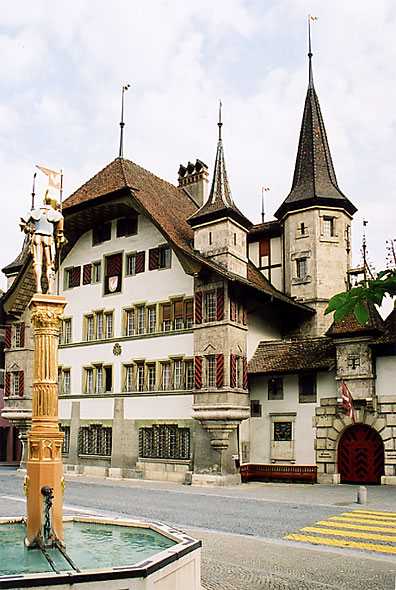
- Büren Castle

Site information
- Owner: Büren an der Aare
- Open to the public: yes

Location
- Coordinates: 47.140074°N 7.37142°E

Site history
- Built: 1621-24

Büren Castle (German: Schloss Büren) is a castle in the municipality of Büren an der Aare in the canton of Bern in Switzerland. It is a Swiss heritage site of national significance.

== History ==
The castle was built between 1621 and 1924 as the residence of the Bernese Landvogt of the area. It was built on the site of four farmhouses. From 1624 until the 1798 French invasion, a total of 77 Landvogts lived in the castle. Some bullet scars from the troops that invaded in 1798 are still visible on the castle walls. Today, the castle is home to the municipal administration and government offices. In 2003, the 17th-century murals and other artwork were restored to their original appearance.

== See also ==
- List of castles in Switzerland
