= Lüterswil-Gächliwil =

- Former municipality
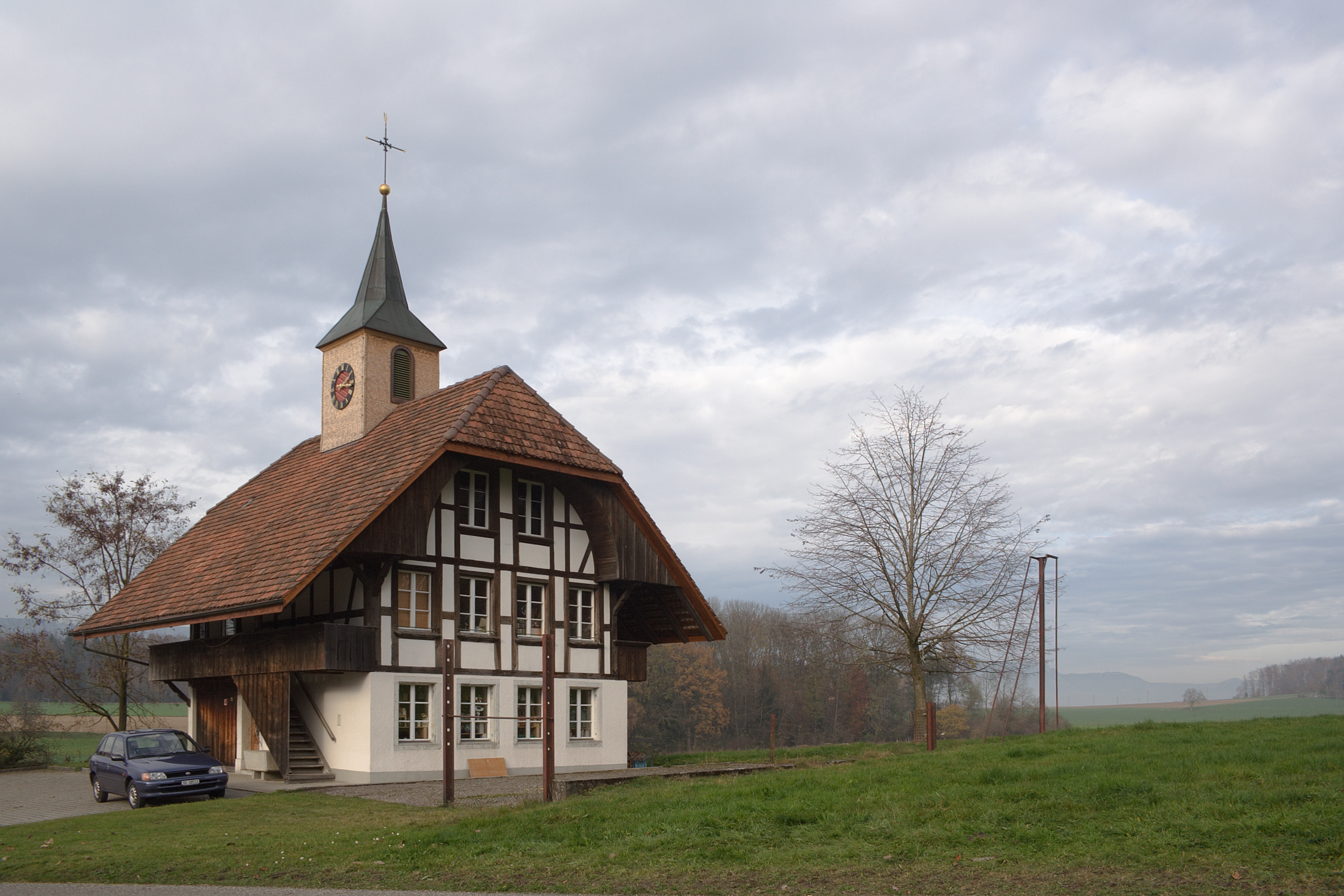
- Old school house in Gächliwil village

- Coat of arms
- Location of Lüterswil-Gächliwil
- Location within Switzerland Location within Canton of Solothurn
- Coordinates: 47°7′N 7°26′E
- Country: Switzerland
- Canton: Solothurn
- District: Bucheggberg

Area
  - Total: 3.05 km^{2} (1.18 sq mi)
- Elevation: 582 m (1,909 ft)

Population (December 2020)
  - Total: 339
  - Density: 111/km^{2} (288/sq mi)
- Time zone: UTC+01:00 (CET)
  - Summer (DST): UTC+02:00 (CEST)
- Postal code: 4584
- SFOS number: 2456
- ISO 3166 code: CH-SO
- Surrounded by: Aetigkofen, Balm bei Messen, Biezwil, Gossliwil, Hessigkofen, Mühledorf, Oberramsern, Oberwil bei Büren (BE)
- Website: SFSO statistics

Lüterswil-Gächliwil is a former municipality in the district of Bucheggberg, in the canton of Solothurn, Switzerland. It was formed in 1994 from the merger of the two previously independent municipalities of Lüterswil and Gächliwil. On 1 January 2024 the former municipality of Lüterswil-Gächliwil merged into the municipality of Buchegg.

== History ==
Lüterswil is first mentioned in 1276 as zu Lüterswyl though this comes from a 17th-century copy of the original document. It was mentioned in 1369 as ze Luterswile. Gächliwil is first mentioned in 1365 as Gechlenwil.

== Geography ==
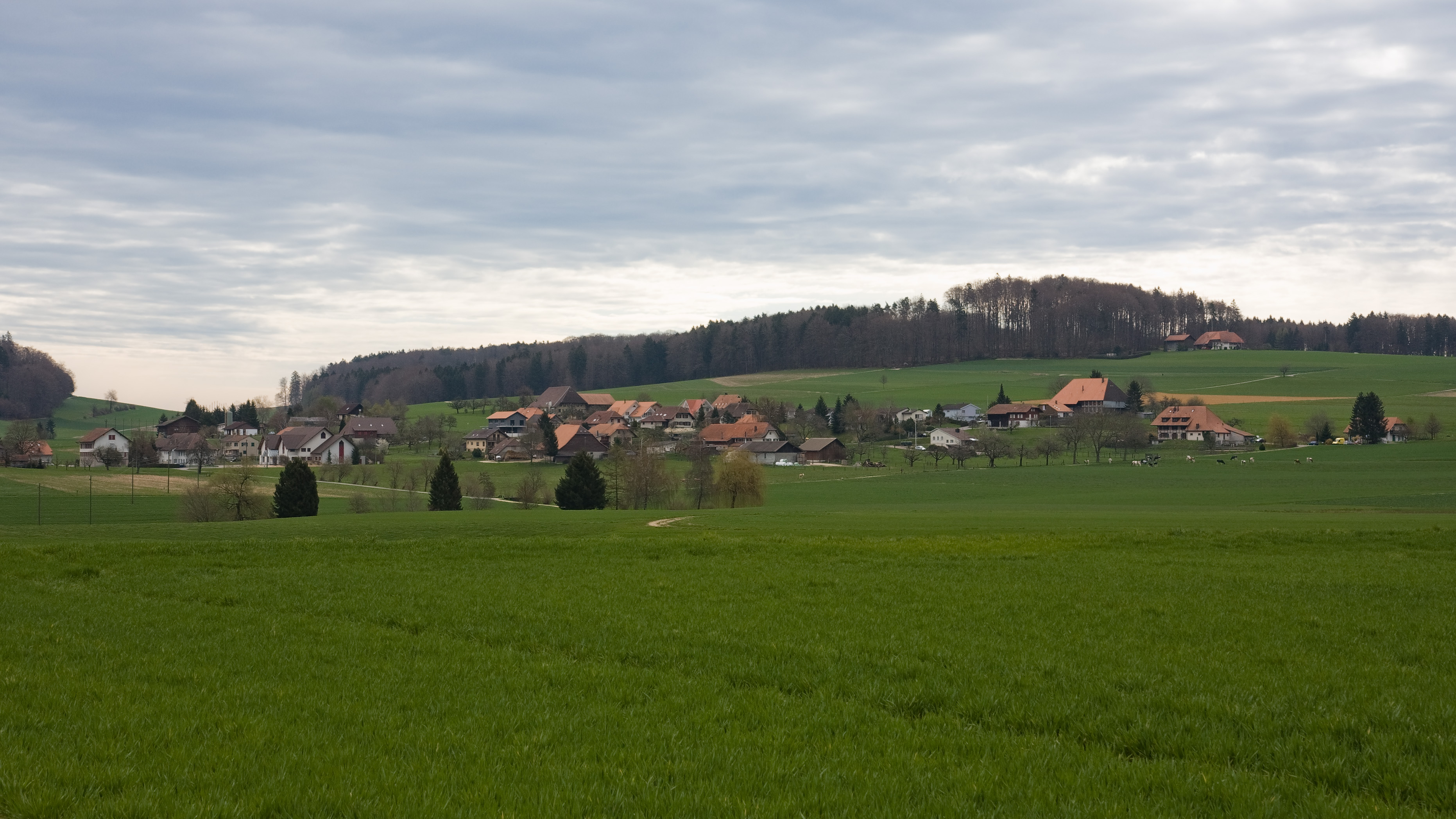
Lüterswil

Aerial view (1949)

Lüterswil-Gächliwil has an area, as of 2009, of 3.05 square kilometers (1.18 sq mi). Of this area, 1.9 km^{2} (0.73 sq mi) or 62.3% is used for agricultural purposes, while 0.99 km^{2} (0.38 sq mi) or 32.5% is forested. Of the rest of the land, 0.19 km^{2} (0.073 sq mi) or 6.2% is settled (buildings or roads).

Of the built up area, housing and buildings made up 3.0% and transportation infrastructure made up 2.3%. Out of the forested land, all of the forested land area is covered with heavy forests. Of the agricultural land, 44.9% is used for growing crops and 16.7% is pastures.

The municipality is located in the Bucheggberg district. It was created in 1995 through the merger of Gächliwil and Lüterswil.

== Coat of arms ==
The blazon of the municipal coat of arms is Per fess Gules a Rock Argent between two Beech Trees Vert and Azure a Semi Horse rampant Argent. The new coat of arms incorporates the symbols of both former municipalities.

== Demographics ==
Lüterswil-Gächliwil has a population (as of December 2020) of 339. As of 2008, 3.5% of the population are resident foreign nationals. Over the last 10 years (1999–2009 ) the population has changed at a rate of -0.9%.

Most of the population (as of 2000) speaks German (366 or 98.7%), with French being second most common (3 or 0.8%) and Italian being third (1 or 0.3%).

As of 2008, the gender distribution of the population was 50.9% male and 49.1% female. The population was made up of 166 Swiss men (49.1% of the population) and 6 (1.8%) non-Swiss men. There were 163 Swiss women (48.2%) and 3 (0.9%) non-Swiss women. Of the population in the municipality 136 or about 36.7% were born in Lüterswil-Gächliwil and lived there in 2000. There were 80 or 21.6% who were born in the same canton, while 126 or 34.0% were born somewhere else in Switzerland, and 13 or 3.5% were born outside of Switzerland.

In 2008 there were 6 live births to Swiss citizens and were 2 deaths of Swiss citizens. Ignoring immigration and emigration, the population of Swiss citizens increased by 4 while the foreign population remained the same. There was 1 Swiss man who emigrated from Switzerland and 1 Swiss woman who immigrated back to Switzerland. At the same time, there were 1 non-Swiss woman who immigrated from another country to Switzerland. The total Swiss population change in 2008 (from all sources, including moves across municipal borders) was an increase of 2 and the non-Swiss population decreased by 1 people. This represents a population growth rate of 0.3%.

The age distribution, as of 2000, in Lüterswil-Gächliwil is; 28 children or 7.5% of the population are between 0 and 6 years old and 56 teenagers or 15.1% are between 7 and 19. Of the adult population, 16 people or 4.3% of the population are between 20 and 24 years old. 98 people or 26.4% are between 25 and 44, and 91 people or 24.5% are between 45 and 64. The senior population distribution is 48 people or 12.9% of the population are between 65 and 79 years old and there are 34 people or 9.2% who are over 80.

As of 2000, there were 147 people who were single and never married in the municipality. There were 171 married individuals, 44 widows or widowers and 9 individuals who are divorced.

As of 2000, there were 129 private households in the municipality, and an average of 2.6 persons per household. There were 32 households that consist of only one person and 10 households with five or more people. Out of a total of 135 households that answered this question, 23.7% were households made up of just one person. Of the rest of the households, there are 37 married couples without children, 54 married couples with children There were 6 households that were made up of unrelated people and 6 households that were made up of some sort of institution or another collective housing.

In 2000 there were 62 single family homes (or 56.9% of the total) out of a total of 109 inhabited buildings. There were 8 multi-family buildings (7.3%), along with 29 multi-purpose buildings that were mostly used for housing (26.6%) and 10 other use buildings (commercial or industrial) that also had some housing (9.2%). Of the single family homes 15 were built before 1919, while 8 were built between 1990 and 2000. The greatest number of single family homes (20) were built between 1981 and 1990.

In 2000 there were 136 apartments in the municipality. The most common apartment size was 4 rooms of which there were 47. There were single room apartments and 63 apartments with five or more rooms. Of these apartments, a total of 119 apartments (87.5% of the total) were permanently occupied, while 14 apartments (10.3%) were seasonally occupied and 3 apartments (2.2%) were empty. As of 2009, the construction rate of new housing units was 5.9 new units per 1000 residents. The vacancy rate for the municipality, in 2010, was 1.32%.

The historical population is given in the following chart:

== Politics ==
In the 2007 federal election the most popular party was the FDP which received 30.8% of the vote. The next three most popular parties were the SVP (27.39%), the SP (22.56%) and the CVP (10.21%). In the federal election, a total of 162 votes were cast, and the voter turnout was 61.1%.

== Economy ==
As of 2010, Lüterswil-Gächliwil had an unemployment rate of 0.6%. As of 2008, there were 25 people employed in the primary economic sector and about 11 businesses involved in this sector. 10 people were employed in the secondary sector and there were 4 businesses in this sector. 116 people were employed in the tertiary sector, with 12 businesses in this sector. There were 180 residents of the municipality who were employed in some capacity, of which females made up 41.7% of the workforce.

In 2008 the total number of full-time equivalent jobs was 103. The number of jobs in the primary sector was 13, all of which were in agriculture. The number of jobs in the secondary sector was 10 of which 2 or (20.0%) were in manufacturing and 8 (80.0%) were in construction. The number of jobs in the tertiary sector was 80. In the tertiary sector; 6 or 7.5% were in wholesale or retail sales or the repair of motor vehicles, 3 or 3.8% were in a hotel or restaurant, 20 or 25.0% were the insurance or financial industry, 5 or 6.3% were technical professionals or scientists, and 47 or 58.8% were in health care.

In 2000, there were 70 workers who commuted into the municipality and 117 workers who commuted away. The municipality is a net exporter of workers, with about 1.7 workers leaving the municipality for every one entering. Of the working population, 8.3% used public transportation to get to work, and 61.7% used a private car.

== Religion ==
From the 2000 census, 39 or 10.5% were Roman Catholic, while 305 or 82.2% belonged to the Swiss Reformed Church. Of the rest of the population, and there was 1 individual who belongs to another Christian church. 21 (or about 5.66% of the population) belonged to no church, are agnostic or atheist, and 5 individuals (or about 1.35% of the population) did not answer the question.

== Education ==
In Lüterswil-Gächliwil about 161 or (43.4%) of the population have completed non-mandatory upper secondary education, and 41 or (11.1%) have completed additional higher education (either university or a Fachhochschule). Of the 41 who completed tertiary schooling, 80.5% were Swiss men, 19.5% were Swiss women.

As of 2000, there were 17 students in Lüterswil-Gächliwil who came from another municipality, while 31 residents attended schools outside the municipality.
