= Val Colla =

Valley in Ticino, Switzerland

Coordinates: 46°05′11″N 9°02′22″E

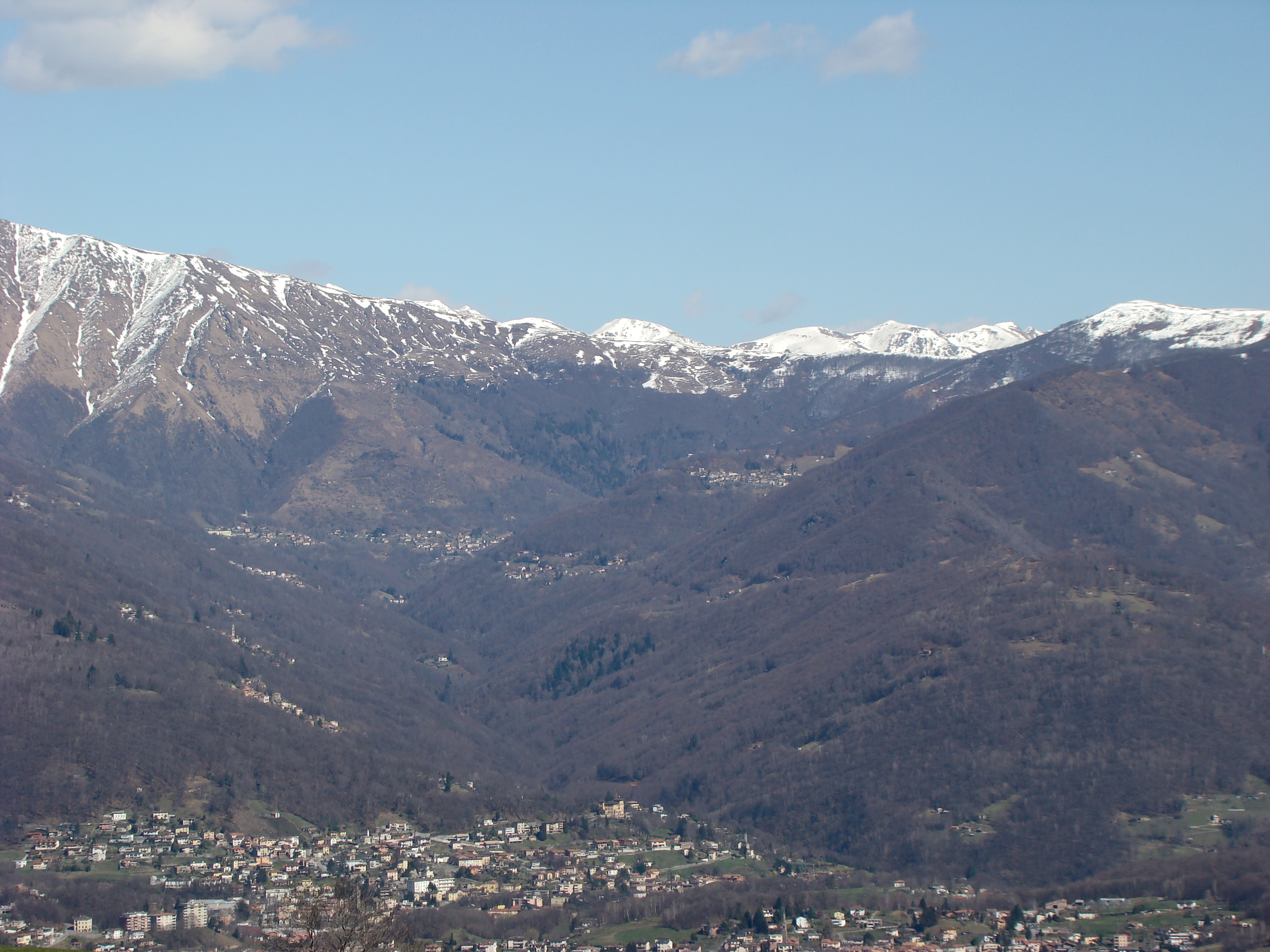
The Val Colla

The Val Colla is a valley and a quarter of the city of Lugano in the Swiss canton of Ticino, to the north-east of the city of Lugano. It includes the localities of Bogno, Valcolla, Certara, Cimadera, Sonvico, which are all part of the city of Lugano, and the municipality of Capriasca.

The valley contains the Cassarate River and its headwaters. To the north the valley is flanked by Monte Bar and Monte Gazzirola. To the east is the San Lucio Pass, which connects the Val Colla with the Val Cavargna in Italy. To the south the valley is flanked by the Cima di Fiorina and the Denti della Vecchia.
