= Bidogno =

- Former municipality
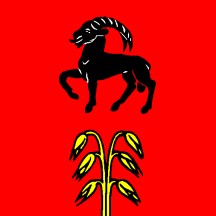
- Flag Coat of arms
- Location of Bidogno
- Location within Switzerland Location within Canton of Ticino
- Coordinates: 46°5′N 9°0′E
- Country: Switzerland
- Canton: Ticino
- District: Lugano

Area
  - Total: 3.48 km^{2} (1.34 sq mi)
- Elevation: 790 m (2,590 ft)

Population (December 2004)
  - Total: 328
  - Density: 94.3/km^{2} (244/sq mi)
- Time zone: UTC+01:00 (CET)
  - Summer (DST): UTC+02:00 (CEST)
- Postal code: 6958
- SFOS number: 5150
- ISO 3166 code: CH-TI
- Surrounded by: Capriasca, Corticiasca, Sonvico, Valcolla
- Website: www.bidogno.ch

Bidogno was a municipality in the district of Lugano, in the canton of Ticino in Switzerland.

== Coat of arms ==
The municipality's coat of arms was: Gules a he-goat sable passant and in base two ears of oat issuant.
