= San Lucio Pass =

- Passo San Lucio
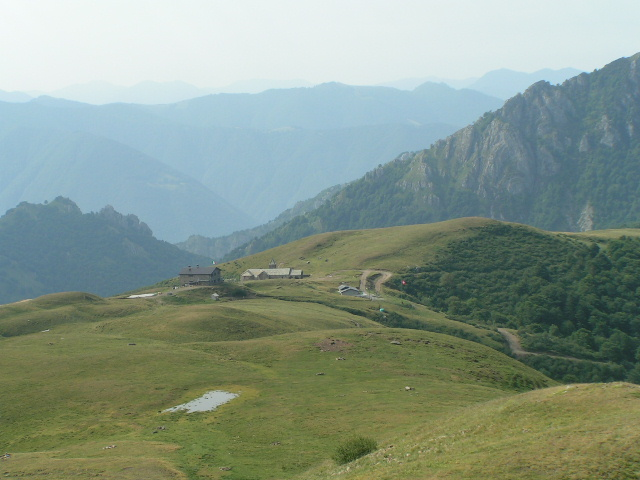

- Location within Switzerland
- Elevation: 1,541 metres (5,056 ft)
- Traversed by: Track

Third Approach
- Location: Ticino, Switzerland; Lombardy, Italy
- Range: Lugano Prealps
- Coordinates: 46°05′14″N 9°05′23″E

The San Lucio Pass (Italian: Passo San Lucio), located in the Lugano Prealps at an altitude of 1,541 metres (5,056 ft) above sea level, connects the Val Cavargna in the Italian province of Como with the Val Colla in the Swiss canton of Ticino. The pass is shared by the municipalities of Cavargna (Italy) and Bogno (Switzerland).

The pass is accessible by road from the Italian side, and by dirt track from the Swiss side. At the summit of the pass is a 14th-century church, dedicated to Saint Lucio after whom the pass is named, and a pair of refuges.

The feast day of Saint Lucio, also known as Saint Uguzo and the patron saint of alpine dairymen, is celebrated on the pass on 12 July and 16 August. It is attended by large numbers of visitors from both sides of the border.
