= Bogno =

- Former municipality
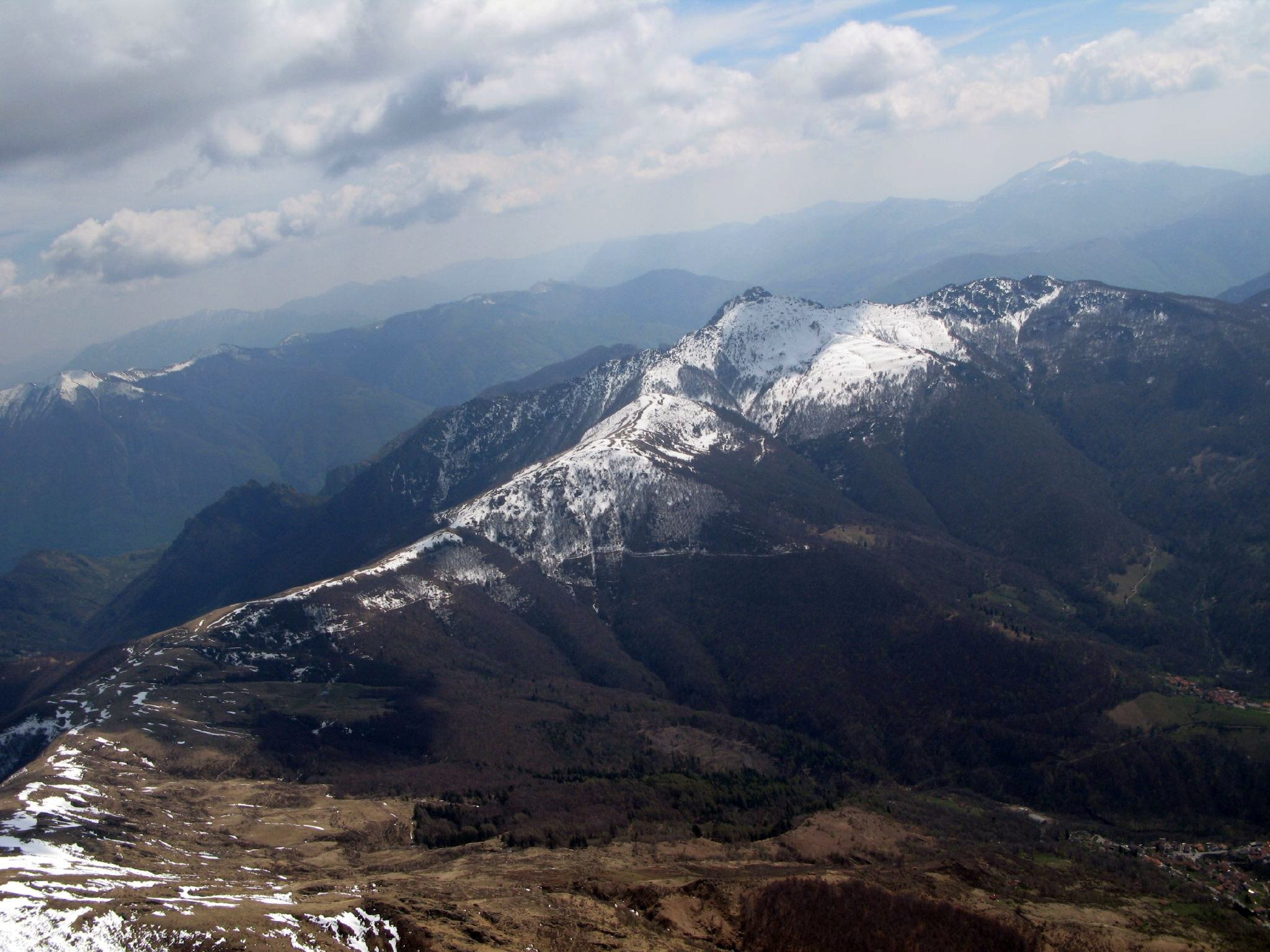

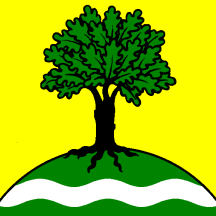
- Flag Coat of arms
- Location of Bogno
- Location within Switzerland Location within Canton of Ticino
- Coordinates: 46°05′N 9°04′E
- Country: Switzerland
- Canton: Ticino
- District: Lugano

Area
  - Total: 4.2 km^{2} (1.6 sq mi)
- Elevation: 960 m (3,150 ft)

Population (Dec 2011)
  - Total: 144
  - Density: 34/km^{2} (89/sq mi)
- Time zone: UTC+01:00 (CET)
  - Summer (DST): UTC+02:00 (CEST)
- Postal code: 6951
- SFOS number: 5155
- ISO 3166 code: CH-TI
- Surrounded by: Cavargna (IT-CO), Certara, Valcolla, Val Rezzo (IT-CO)
- Website: SFSO statistics

Bogno is a former municipality in the district of Lugano in the canton of Ticino in Switzerland. On 14 April 2013 the former municipalities of Bogno, Cadro, Carona, Certara, Cimadera, Valcolla and Sonvico merged into the municipality of Lugano.

== History ==
Bogno is first mentioned in the 13th century as Bonio. It grew into a permanent settlement from the seasonal herding camps around the alpine pastures. The pastures were originally used by the inhabitants of the settlements of Sonvico, Colla, Insone, Scareglia, Signora and Piandera.

The church of S. Rocco is first mentioned in 1591. It was renovated and extended in 1780. In 1811, it was demolished by the parish of Colla.

The agricultural community maintained close relations with the neighboring Italian villages of the Val Cavargna which were reached by crossing the 1,541 m (5,056 ft) high S. Lucio pass. Throughout most of its history the village was isolated from most of the rest of the country. This changed in 1854 when the first road was built into the valley. About three decades later, in 1886, another road was completed. The new roads tied the village more closely with the city of Lugano. In the 20th century, the population dropped sharply because fewer agriculture jobs forced the residents to migrate to Lugano. Many houses have been converted to second homes and vacation homes. The main businesses in the municipality are a carpenter and an inn.

== Geography ==
Bogno is located in the upper Val Colla, at the confluence of the streams that make up the Cassarate River, and below the San Lucio Pass.

Before the merger, Bogno had a total area of 4.2 km^{2} (1.6 mi^{2}). Of this area, 0.27 km^{2} (0.10 sq mi) or 6.4% is used for agricultural purposes, while 2.26 km^{2} (0.87 sq mi) or 53.7% is forested. Of the rest of the land, 0.13 km^{2} (32 acres) or 3.1% is settled (buildings or roads) and 0.28 km^{2} (0.11 sq mi) or 6.7% is unproductive land.

Of the built up area, housing and buildings made up 1.2% and transportation infrastructure made up 1.7%. Out of the forested land, 49.6% of the total land area is heavily forested and 2.1% is covered with orchards or small clusters of trees. Of the agricultural land, 5.2% is used for growing crops and 1.2% is used for alpine pastures. Of the unproductive areas, 6.4% is unproductive vegetation and .

== Coat of arms ==
The blazon of the municipal coat of arms is Or an oak vert trunked sable issuant from a mount of the second with a bar wavy argent.

== Demographics ==
Bogno had a population (as of 2011) of 144. As of 2008, 12.9% of the population are resident foreign nationals. Over the last 10 years (1997–2007) the population has changed at a rate of 8.4%.

Most of the population (as of 2000) speaks Italian (84.9%), with German being second most common (11.8%) and French being third (1.1%). Of the Swiss national languages (as of 2000), 11 speak German, 1 person speaks French, 79 people speak Italian. The remainder (2 people) speak another language.

As of 2008, the gender distribution of the population was 55.0% male and 45.0% female. The population was made up of 63 Swiss men (48.1% of the population), and 9 (6.9%) non-Swiss men. There were 50 Swiss women (38.2%), and 9 (6.9%) non-Swiss women.

In 2008 there was 1 live birth to Swiss citizens and . Ignoring immigration and emigration, the population of Swiss citizens increased by 1 while the foreign population remained the same. There was 1 Swiss woman who emigrated from Switzerland. At the same time, there was 1 non-Swiss man and 2 non-Swiss women who immigrated from another country to Switzerland. The total Swiss population change in 2008 (from all sources, including moves across municipal borders) was an increase of 3 and the non-Swiss population change was a decrease of 8 people. This represents a population growth rate of -3.9%.

The age distribution, as of 2009, in Bogno is; 10 children or 7.6% of the population are between 0 and 9 years old and 15 teenagers or 11.5% are between 10 and 19. Of the adult population, 15 people or 11.5% of the population are between 20 and 29 years old. 19 people or 14.5% are between 30 and 39, 18 people or 13.7% are between 40 and 49, and 16 people or 12.2% are between 50 and 59. The senior population distribution is 18 people or 13.7% of the population are between 60 and 69 years old, 14 people or 10.7% are between 70 and 79, there are 6 people or 4.6% who are over 80.

As of 2000, there were 41 private households in the municipality, and an average of 2.2 persons per household. In 2000 there were 105 single family homes (or 93.8% of the total) out of a total of 112 inhabited buildings. There were 3 two family buildings (2.7%) and 2 multi-family buildings (1.8%). There were also 2 buildings in the municipality that were multipurpose buildings (used for both housing and commercial or another purpose).

The vacancy rate for the municipality, in 2008, was 0%. In 2000 there were 117 apartments in the municipality. The most common apartment size was the 4 room apartment of which there were 38. There were 10 single room apartments and 26 apartments with five or more rooms. Of these apartments, a total of 41 apartments (35.0% of the total) were permanently occupied, while 75 apartments (64.1%) were seasonally occupied and 1 apartment (0.9%) was empty. As of 2007, the construction rate of new housing units was 0 new units per 1000 residents.

The historical population is given in the following table:

year	population
1591	20 Hearths
1786	254
1828	250
1850	261
1871	412
1900	225

== Politics ==
In the 2007 federal election the most popular party was the Ticino League which received 27.75% of the vote. The next three most popular parties were the CVP (23.7%), the FDP (21.1%) and the SP (16.76%). In the federal election, a total of 44 votes were cast, and the voter turnout was 42.7%.

In the 2007 Gran Consiglio election, there were a total of 92 registered voters in Bogno, of which 59 or 64.1% voted. The most popular party was the LEGA which received 16 or 27.1% of the vote. The next three most popular parties were; the PLRT and the PPD+GenGiova ( both with 10 or 16.9%) and the PS (with 9 or 15.3%).

In the 2007 Consiglio di Stato election, 1 null ballot was cast, leaving 58 valid ballots in the election. The most popular party was the LEGA which received 20 or 34.5% of the vote. The next three most popular parties were; the PPD (with 12 or 20.7%), the PLRT (with 10 or 17.2%) and the PS (with 8 or 13.8%).

== Economy ==
As of 2007, Bogno had an unemployment rate of 4.82%. As of 2005, there were people employed in the primary economic sector and about businesses involved in this sector. 2 people were employed in the secondary sector and there were 2 businesses in this sector. 11 people were employed in the tertiary sector, with 5 businesses in this sector. There were 37 residents of the municipality who were employed in some capacity, of which females made up 40.5% of the workforce.

In 2000, there were 7 workers who commuted into the municipality and 22 workers who commuted away. The municipality is a net exporter of workers, with about 3.1 workers leaving the municipality for every one entering. Of the working population, 0% used public transportation to get to work, and 78.4% used a private car. As of 2009, there were 0 hotels in Bogno.

== Religion ==
From the 2000 census, 78 or 83.9% were Roman Catholic, while 3 or 3.2% belonged to the Swiss Reformed Church. There are 10 individuals (or about 10.75% of the population) who belong to another church (not listed on the census), and 2 individuals (or about 2.15% of the population) did not answer the question.

== Education ==
The entire Swiss population is generally well educated. In Bogno about 58.3% of the population (between age 25 and 64) have completed either non-mandatory upper secondary education or additional higher education (either university or a Fachhochschule).

In Bogno there were a total of 15 students (as of 2009). The Ticino education system provides up to three years of non-mandatory kindergarten and in Bogno there were children in kindergarten. The primary school program lasts for five years. In the municipality, 2 students attended the standard primary schools. In the lower secondary school system, students either attend a two-year middle school followed by a two-year pre-apprenticeship or they attend a four-year program to prepare for higher education. There were 8 students in the two-year middle school, while 0 students were in the four-year advanced program.

The upper secondary school includes several options, but at the end of the upper secondary program, a student will be prepared to enter a trade or to continue on to a university or college. In Ticino, vocational students may either attend school while working on their internship or apprenticeship (which takes three or four years) or may attend school followed by an internship or apprenticeship (which takes one year as a full-time student or one and a half to two years as a part-time student). There was 1 vocational student who was attending school full-time and 4 who attend part-time.

As of 2000, there were 4 students from Bogno who attended schools outside the municipality.
