= Carona, Ticino =

Carona
- Former municipality
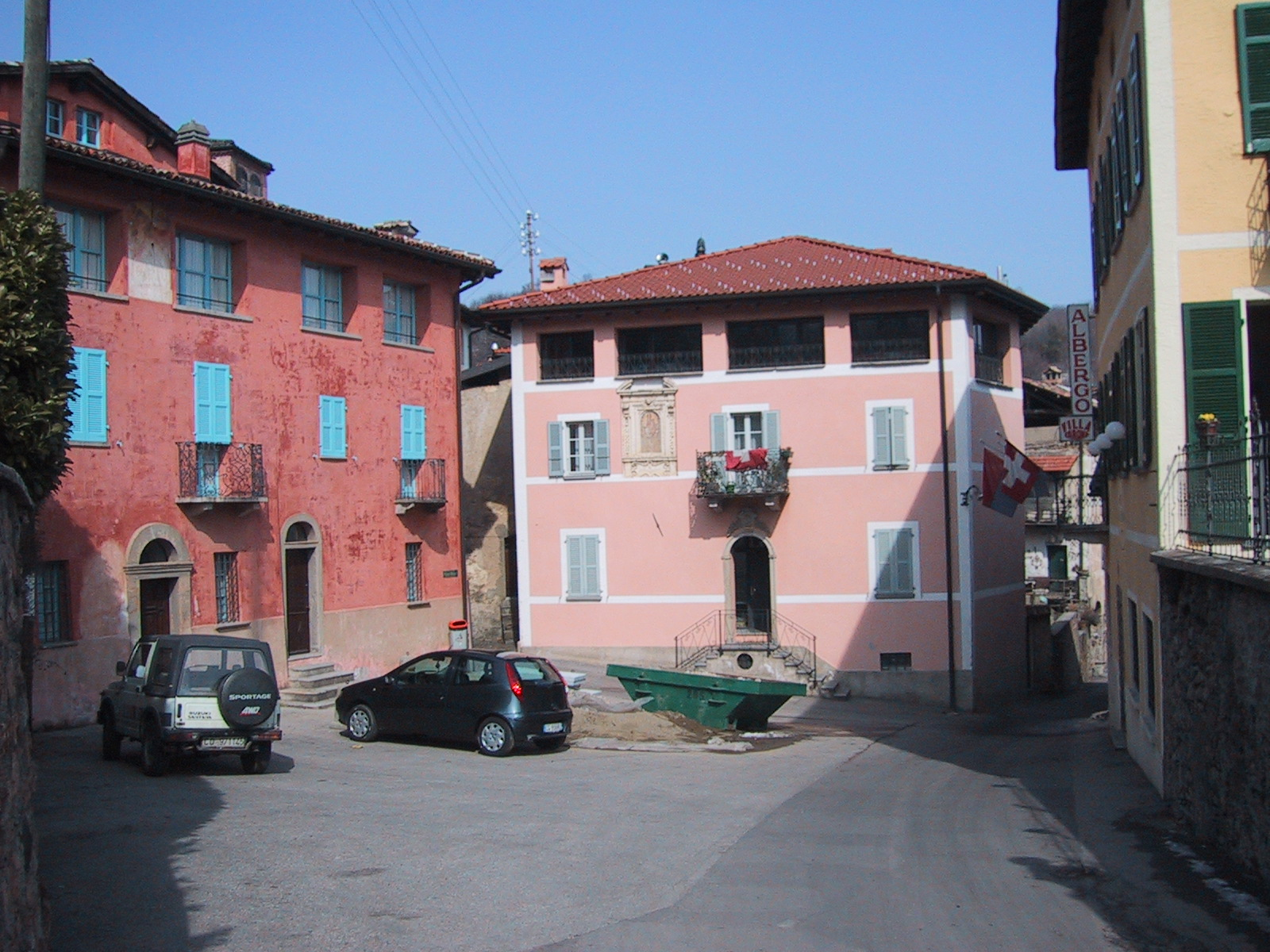

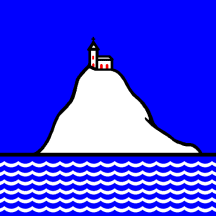
- Flag Coat of arms
- Location of Carona
- Location within Switzerland Location within Canton of Ticino
- Coordinates: 45°57′N 8°56′E
- Country: Switzerland
- Canton: Ticino
- District: Lugano

Area
  - Total: 4.75 km^{2} (1.83 sq mi)
- Elevation: 597 m (1,959 ft)

Population (Dec 2011)
  - Total: 827
  - Density: 174/km^{2} (451/sq mi)
- Time zone: UTC+01:00 (CET)
  - Summer (DST): UTC+02:00 (CEST)
- Postal code: 6914
- SFOS number: 5170
- ISO 3166 code: CH-TI
- Surrounded by: Lugano, Melide, Morcote, Vico Morcote
- Website: SFSO statistics

Carona is a former municipality in the district of Lugano in the canton of Ticino in Switzerland. On 14 April 2013 the former municipalities of Bogno, Cadro, Carona, Certara, Cimadera, Valcolla and Sonvico merged into the municipality of Lugano.

== History ==
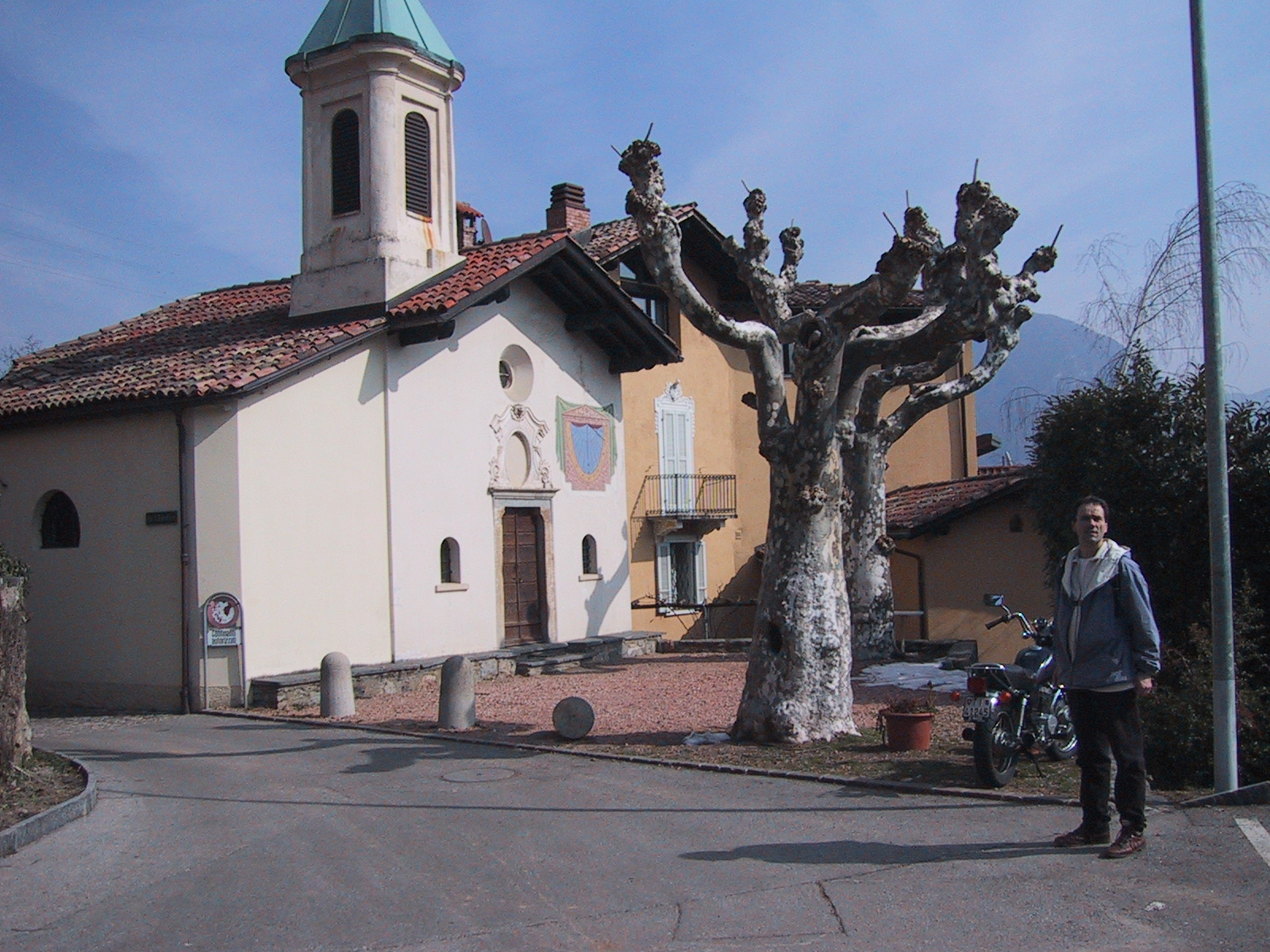
Chapel of S. Maria delle Grazie in Ciona

Carona is first mentioned in 926 as Calauna. The hamlet of Ciona was first mentioned in 1213.

During the Middle Ages the village of Carona and the hamlet of Ciona formed a Kastlanei of the Bishop of Como. During the Middle Ages, the Church of Santa Maria was built in the hamlet of Torello. After 1349, the church was supported by a community of Augustinians Canons from the nearby monastery (built in 1217 by Guglielmo Della Torre). For the village's loyalty to the Visconti and Guelph families, it received its coat of arms. According to Swiss Confederation law, it enjoyed a special status (terra separata) which included exemption from certain laws and taxes. The old, medieval statutes were renewed in 1470.

The Carona romanesque village church of San Giorgio was first mentioned in 1425. Two years later it was raised to become a parish church. The church of S. Marta was built in the 14th century, and was formerly known as the Church of SS Pietro e Paolo. The Baroque pilgrimage church of Madonna d'Ongero was built in 1624, to the west of the village in the forest. The church of S. Maria delle Grazie was built in Ciona. The last two churches as well as the homes of the village from the 17th and 18th centuries represent the growing wealth of the village, through emigration of artists from Carona. The Carona artist families, including the Aprile, Casella, Scala and Solari families, were active throughout Europe during the 15th-18th centuries.

The village remained an agricultural and grazing village until the beginning of the 19th century, when Lugano developed into a tourist destination. In 1943, the S. Grato hill was cleared and farming began on the hill. However, the buildings were later converted into a vacation complex. After centuries of decline, the population doubled in the 1970s and 80s, as new homes were built outside the historic core village. In 2000 21% of the population spoke German. There is a major swimming pool and sports center, that serve the surrounding communities.

== Geography ==
Aerial view from 1200 m by Walter Mittelholzer (1919)

Before the merger, Carona had a total area of 4.8 km^{2} (1.9 mi^{2}). Of this area, 0.46 km^{2} (0.18 sq mi) or 9.7% is used for agricultural purposes, while 4.02 km^{2} (1.55 sq mi) or 84.6% is forested. Of the rest of the land, 0.57 km^{2} (0.22 sq mi) or 12.0% is settled (buildings or roads) and 0.06 km^{2} (15 acres) or 1.3% is unproductive land.

Of the built up area, housing and buildings made up 7.2% and transportation infrastructure made up 2.1%. while parks, green belts and sports fields made up 2.5%. Out of the forested land, 80.8% of the total land area is heavily forested and 3.8% is covered with orchards or small clusters of trees. Of the agricultural land, 2.5% is used for growing crops and 7.2% is used for alpine pastures.

The former municipality is located in the Lugano district, between the S. Salvatore and Arbostora mountains near Lake Lugano. It consists of the village of Carona and the hamlets of Ciona and Torello.

Carona also features Parco San Grato, a park with views over Lake Lugano and a collection of azaleas, rhododendrons and conifers.

== Coat of arms ==
The blazon of the municipal coat of arms is "Azure a church argent with widowns [sic] and doors gules on a clif [sic] of the second issuant from a lake proper in the base."

== Demographics ==
Carona had a population (as of 2011) of 827. As of 2008, 19.5% of the population are resident foreign nationals. Over the last 10 years (1997–2007) the population has changed at a rate of 10.1%.

Most of the population (as of 2000) speaks Italian (69.8%), with German being second most common (21.0%) and English being third (4.0%). Of the Swiss national languages (as of 2000), 143 speak German, 19 people speak French, 475 people speak Italian. The remainder (44 people) speak another language.

As of 2008, the gender distribution of the population was 46.5% male and 53.5% female. The population was made up of 276 Swiss men (35.7% of the population), and 84 (10.9%) non-Swiss men. There were 342 Swiss women (44.2%), and 72 (9.3%) non-Swiss women.

In 2008 there were 6 live births to Swiss citizens and 1 birth to non-Swiss citizens, and in same time span there were 5 deaths of Swiss citizens and 1 non-Swiss citizen death. Ignoring immigration and emigration, the population of Swiss citizens increased by 1 while the foreign population remained the same. There was 1 Swiss man who immigrated back to Switzerland. At the same time, there were 6 non-Swiss men and 3 non-Swiss women who immigrated from another country to Switzerland. The total Swiss population change in 2008 (from all sources, including moves across municipal borders) was an increase of 4 and the non-Swiss population change was a decrease of 5 people. This represents a population growth rate of -0.1%.

The age distribution, as of 2009, in Carona is; 79 children or 10.2% of the population are between 0 and 9 years old and 64 teenagers or 8.3% are between 10 and 19. Of the adult population, 99 people or 12.8% of the population are between 20 and 29 years old. 79 people or 10.2% are between 30 and 39, 134 people or 17.3% are between 40 and 49, and 130 people or 16.8% are between 50 and 59. The senior population distribution is 110 people or 14.2% of the population are between 60 and 69 years old, 46 people or 5.9% are between 70 and 79, there are 33 people or 4.3% who are over 80.

As of 2000, there were 298 private households in the municipality, and an average of 2.3 persons per household. In 2000 there were 292 single family homes (or 80.0% of the total) out of a total of 365 inhabited buildings. There were 41 two family buildings (11.2%) and 21 multi-family buildings (5.8%). There were also 11 buildings in the municipality that were multipurpose buildings (used for both housing and commercial or another purpose).

The vacancy rate for the municipality, in 2008, was 0%. In 2000 there were 505 apartments in the municipality. The most common apartment size was the 5 room apartment of which there were 174. There were 20 single room apartments and 174 apartments with five or more rooms. Of these apartments, a total of 297 apartments (58.8% of the total) were permanently occupied, while 194 apartments (38.4%) were seasonally occupied and 14 apartments (2.8%) were empty. As of 2007, the construction rate of new housing units was 2.6 new units per 1000 residents.

The historical population is given in the following chart:

== Heritage sites of national significance ==
The Church of Della Madonna D’Ongero, the parish church of SS. Giorgio e Andrea with a community center and the Complex of S. Maria Assunta di Torello are listed as Swiss heritage site of national significance. The village of Carona and the settlements of Ciona and Torello are listed as part of the Inventory of Swiss Heritage Sites.

== Notable people ==
- Giuseppe Antonio Petrini (1677- c.1755–9) a painter of the late-Baroque, active mainly in Lugano, born in Carona, died in Lugano.
- Pietro Antonio Solari (c. 1445 – May 1493) an architect and sculptor, worked for Ivan III, born in Carona, died in Moscow.

== Politics ==
In the 2007 federal election the most popular party was the SP which received 33.52% of the vote. The next three most popular parties were the FDP (23.68%), the CVP (14.29%) and the Green Party (10.18%). In the federal election, a total of 232 votes were cast, and the voter turnout was 44.9%.

In the 2007 Gran Consiglio election, there were a total of 518 registered voters in Carona, of which 280 or 54.1% voted. 2 blank ballots were cast, leaving 278 valid ballots in the election. The most popular party was the PS which received 73 or 26.3% of the vote. The next three most popular parties were; the PLRT (with 62 or 22.3%), the SSI (with 36 or 12.9%) and the Greens (with 32 or 11.5%).

In the 2007 Consiglio di Stato election, 1 blank ballot and 2 null ballots were cast, leaving 277 valid ballots in the election. The most popular party was the PS which received 84 or 30.3% of the vote. The next three most popular parties were; the PLRT (with 58 or 20.9%), the SSI (with 37 or 13.4%) and the LEGA (with 36 or 13.0%).

== Economy ==
As of 2007, Carona had an unemployment rate of 3.07%. As of 2005, there were 2 people employed in the primary economic sector and about 1 business involved in this sector. 7 people were employed in the secondary sector and there were 2 businesses in this sector. 41 people were employed in the tertiary sector, with 18 businesses in this sector. There were 301 residents of the municipality who were employed in some capacity, of which females made up 42.5% of the workforce.

In 2000, there were 35 workers who commuted into the municipality and 219 workers who commuted away. The municipality is a net exporter of workers, with about 6.3 workers leaving the municipality for every one entering. About 25.7% of the workforce coming into Carona are coming from outside Switzerland. Of the working population, 11.3% used public transportation to get to work, and 61.1% used a private car.

As of 2009, there was one hotel in Carona.

== Religion ==
From the 2000 census, 402 or 59.0% were Roman Catholic, while 83 or 12.2% belonged to the Swiss Reformed Church. There are 161 individuals (or about 23.64% of the population) who belong to another church (not listed on the census), and 35 individuals (or about 5.14% of the population) did not answer the question.

== Education ==
The entire Swiss population is generally well educated. In Carona about 81% of the population (between age 25-64) have completed either non-mandatory upper secondary education or additional higher education (either University or a Fachhochschule).

In Carona there were a total of 98 students (as of 2009). The Ticino education system provides up to three years of non-mandatory kindergarten and in Carona there were 4 children in kindergarten. The primary school program lasts for five years and includes both a standard school and a special school. In the municipality, 39 students attended the standard primary schools and 1 student attended the special school. In the lower secondary school system, students either attend a two-year middle school followed by a two-year pre-apprenticeship or they attend a four-year program to prepare for higher education. There were 23 students in the two-year middle school, while 15 students were in the four-year advanced program.

The upper secondary school includes several options, but at the end of the upper secondary program, a student will be prepared to enter a trade or to continue on to a university or college. In Ticino, vocational students may either attend school while working on their internship or apprenticeship (which takes three or four years) or may attend school followed by an internship or apprenticeship (which takes one year as a full-time student or one and a half to two years as a part-time student). There were 6 vocational students who were attending school full-time and 9 who attend part-time.

The professional program lasts three years and prepares a student for a job in engineering, nursing, computer science, business, tourism and similar fields. There was 1 student in the professional program.

As of 2000, there were 116 students from Carona who attended schools outside the municipality.
