= Valcolla =

- Quarter
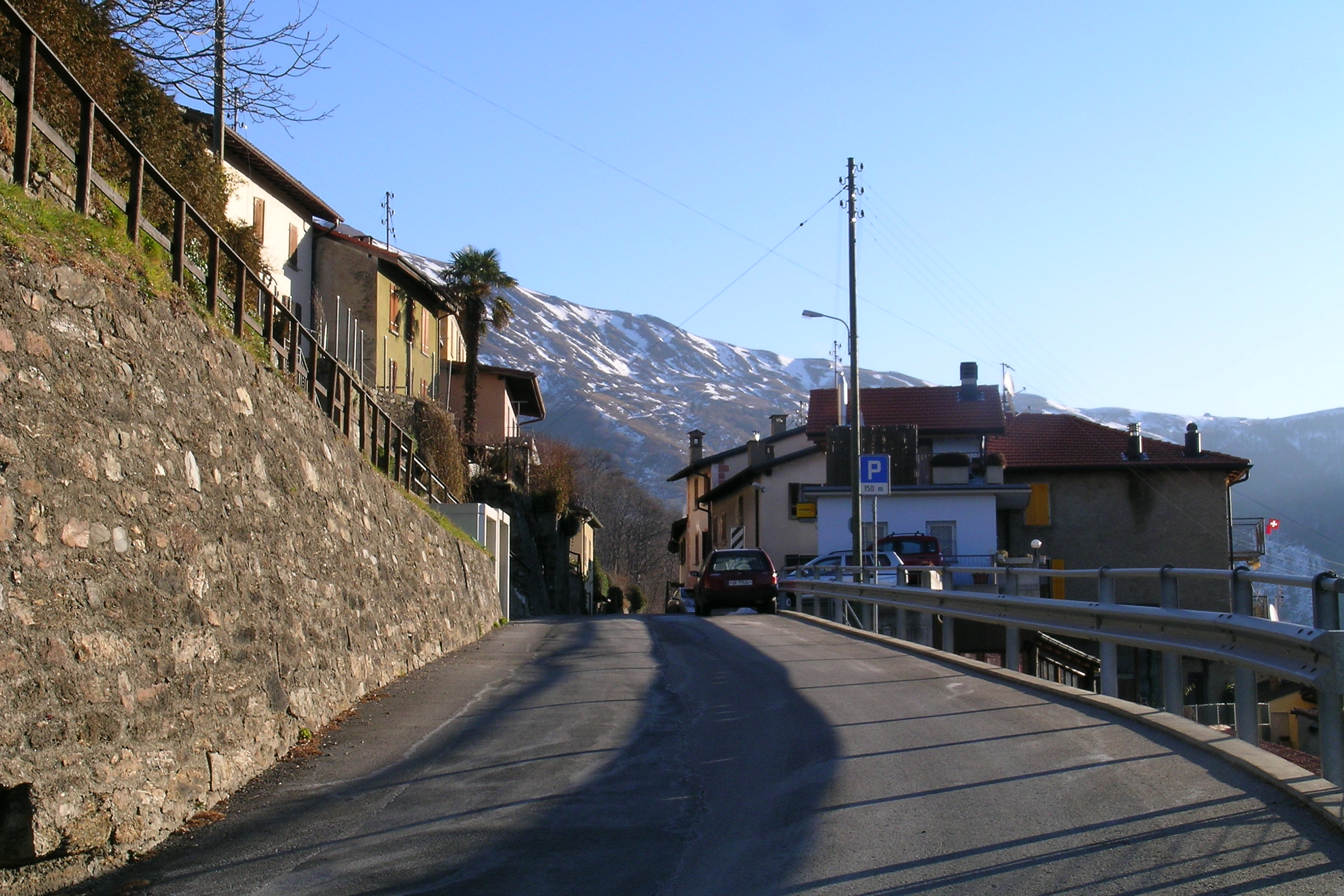
- Scareglia village

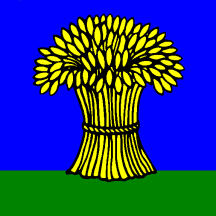
- Flag Coat of arms

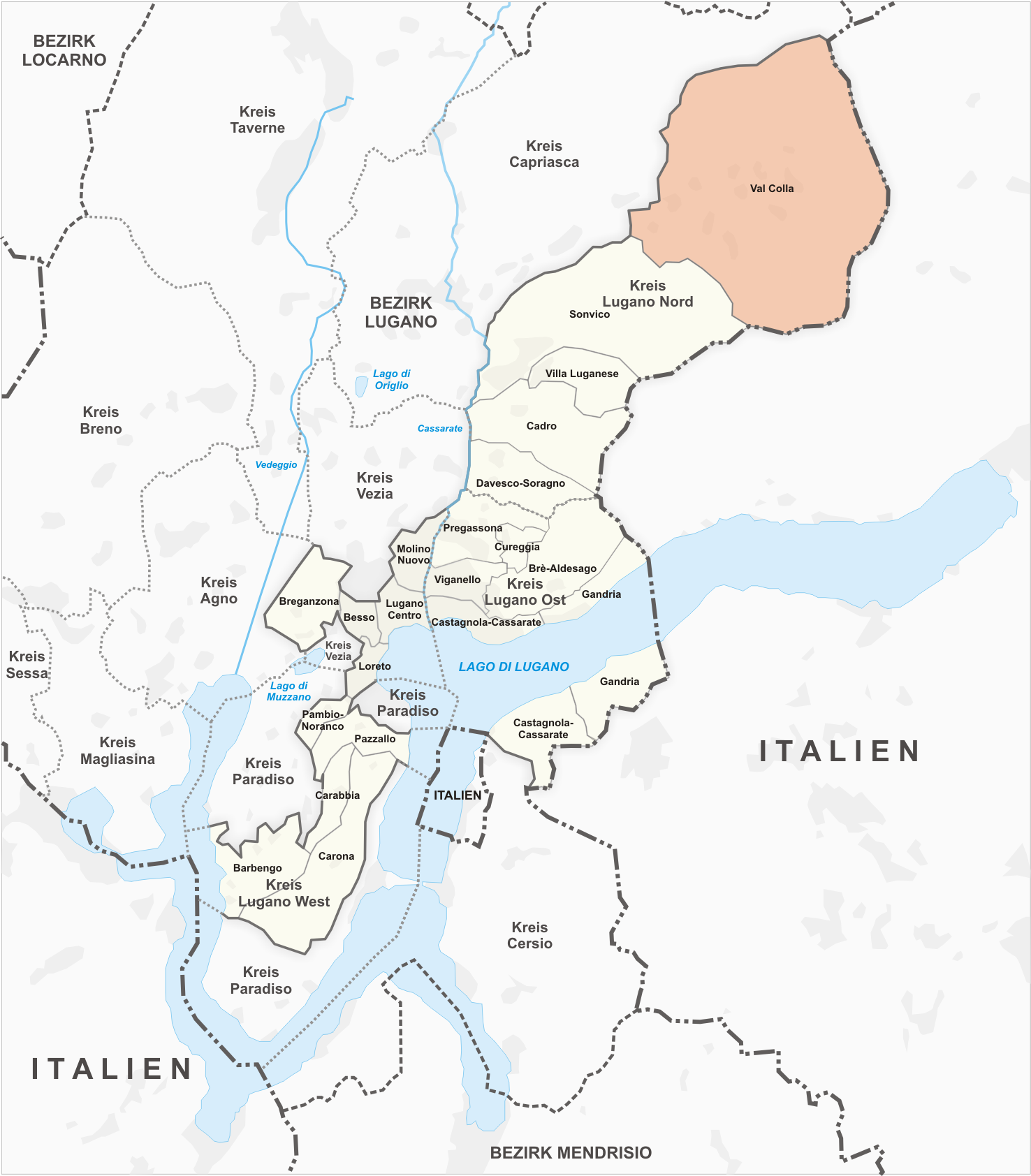

- Location within Switzerland
- Coordinates: 46°5′N 9°2′E
- Country: Switzerland
- Canton: Ticino
- District: Lugano
- City: Lugano

Area
  - Total: 11.3 km^{2} (4.4 sq mi)
- Elevation: 972 m (3,189 ft)

Population (2025-12-31)
  - Total: 815
  - Density: 72.1/km^{2} (187/sq mi)
- Postal code: 6959
- SFOS number: 5229
- ISO 3166 code: CH-TI
- Surrounded by: Bidogno, Bogno, Capriasca, Cavargna (IT-CO), Certara, Cimadera, Corticiasca, Ponte Capriasca, Sonvico

Valcolla is a quarter of the city of Lugano and former municipality in the district of Lugano in the canton of Ticino in Switzerland. On 14 April 2013 the former municipalities of Bogno, Cadro, Carona, Certara, Cimadera, Sonvico and Valcolla merged into the municipality of Lugano.

== Geography ==
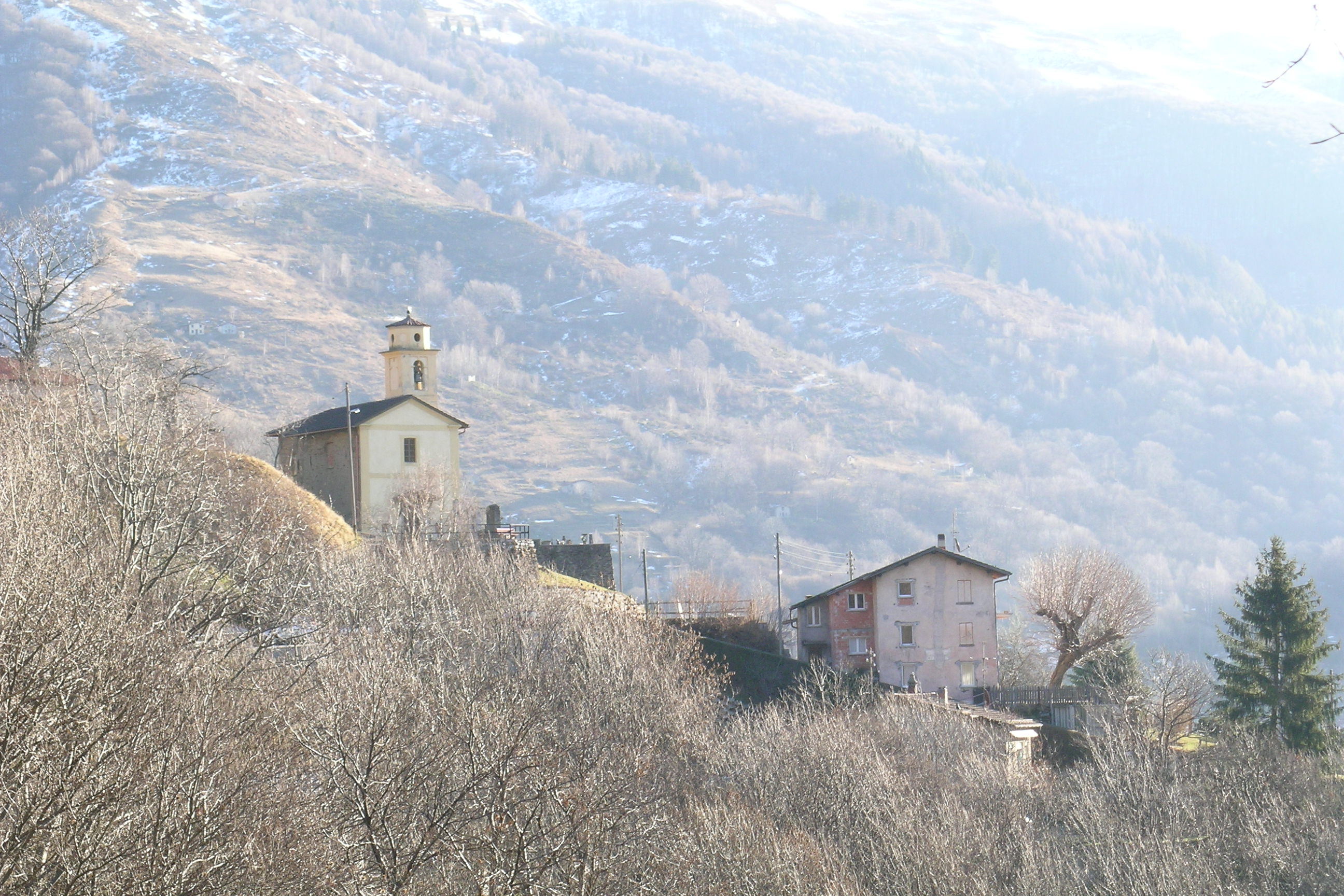
Signôr village

Valcolla is in the upper section of the Val Colla, the mountain valley in which the Cassarate River rises.

Before the merger, Valcolla had a total area of 11.3 km^{2} (4.4 mi^{2}). Of this area, 0.55 km^{2} (0.21 sq mi) or 4.9% is used for agricultural purposes, while 5.89 km^{2} (2.27 sq mi) or 51.9% is forested. Of the rest of the land, 0.38 km^{2} (0.15 sq mi) or 3.4% is settled (buildings or roads), 0.04 km^{2} (9.9 acres) or 0.4% is either rivers or lakes and 1.2 km^{2} (0.46 sq mi) or 10.6% is unproductive land.

Of the built up area, housing and buildings made up 2.2% and transportation infrastructure made up 0.5%. Out of the forested land, 45.4% of the total land area is heavily forested and 2.2% is covered with orchards or small clusters of trees. Of the agricultural land, 2.6% is used for growing crops and 2.2% is used for alpine pastures. All the water in the municipality is flowing water. Of the unproductive areas, 10.1% is unproductive vegetation.

In 1956 the municipality was created from the merger of Colla, Insone, Piandera, Scareglia and Signôra.

== Coat of arms ==
The blazon of the municipal coat of arms is Azure a garbe or on a base vert.

== Demographics ==
Valcolla had a population (as of 2011) of 629. As of 2008, 7.7% of the population are resident foreign nationals. Over the last 10 years (1997–2007) the population has changed at a rate of 16%.

Most of the population (as of 2000) speaks Italian (88.5%), with German being second most common (8.8%) and French being third (1.3%). Of the Swiss national languages (as of 2000), 49 speak German, 7 people speak French, 494 people speak Italian, and 1 person speaks Romansh. The remainder (7 people) speak another language.

As of 2008, the gender distribution of the population was 49.1% male and 50.9% female. The population was made up of 278 Swiss men (44.9% of the population), and 26 (4.2%) non-Swiss men. There were 292 Swiss women (47.2%), and 23 (3.7%) non-Swiss women.

In 2008 there were 4 live births to Swiss citizens and were 7 deaths of Swiss citizens and 1 non-Swiss citizen death. Ignoring immigration and emigration, the population of Swiss citizens decreased by 3 while the foreign population decreased by 1. There were 2 Swiss men who immigrated back to Switzerland. At the same time, there was 1 non-Swiss man and 4 non-Swiss women who immigrated from another country to Switzerland. The total Swiss population change in 2008 (from all sources, including moves across municipal borders) was a decrease of 31 and the non-Swiss population change was an increase of 1 people. This represents a population growth rate of -4.8%.

The age distribution, as of 2009, in Valcolla is; 50 children or 8.1% of the population are between 0 and 9 years old and 53 teenagers or 8.6% are between 10 and 19. Of the adult population, 63 people or 10.2% of the population are between 20 and 29 years old. 69 people or 11.1% are between 30 and 39, 119 people or 19.2% are between 40 and 49, and 81 people or 13.1% are between 50 and 59. The senior population distribution is 68 people or 11.0% of the population are between 60 and 69 years old, 68 people or 11.0% are between 70 and 79, there are 48 people or 7.8% who are over 80.

As of 2000, there were 245 private households in the municipality, and an average of 2.1 persons per household. In 2000 there were 466 single family homes (or 92.1% of the total) out of a total of 506 inhabited buildings. There were 29 two family buildings (5.7%) and 4 multi-family buildings (0.8%). There were also 7 buildings in the municipality that were multipurpose buildings (used for both housing and commercial or another purpose).

The vacancy rate for the municipality, in 2008, was 0%. In 2000 there were 541 apartments in the municipality. The most common apartment size was the 5 room apartment of which there were 157. There were 38 single room apartments and 157 apartments with five or more rooms. Of these apartments, a total of 245 apartments (45.3% of the total) were permanently occupied, while 294 apartments (54.3%) were seasonally occupied and 2 apartments (0.4%) were empty. As of 2007, the construction rate of new housing units was 4.8 new units per 1000 residents.

The historical population is given in the following chart:

== Politics ==
In the 2007 federal election the most popular party was the CVP which received 29.28% of the vote. The next three most popular parties were the SP (20.46%), the FDP (18.8%) and the Ticino League (14.21%). In the federal election, a total of 223 votes were cast, and the voter turnout was 44.2%.

In the 2007 Gran Consiglio election, there were a total of 510 registered voters in Valcolla, of which 312 or 61.2% voted. 4 blank ballots and 1 null ballot were cast, leaving 307 valid ballots in the election. The most popular party was the PPD+GenGiova which received 72 or 23.5% of the vote. The next three most popular parties were; the SSI (with 58 or 18.9%), the LEGA (with 52 or 16.9%) and the PS (with 50 or 16.3%).

In the 2007 Consiglio di Stato election, 2 blank ballots and 2 null ballots were cast, leaving 308 valid ballots in the election. The most popular party was the LEGA which received 84 or 27.3% of the vote. The next three most popular parties were; the PPD (with 67 or 21.8%), the PS (with 66 or 21.4%) and the PLRT (with 42 or 13.6%).

== Economy ==
As of 2007, Valcolla had an unemployment rate of 4.79%. As of 2005, there were 8 people employed in the primary economic sector and about 4 businesses involved in this sector. 6 people were employed in the secondary sector and there were 3 businesses in this sector. 88 people were employed in the tertiary sector, with 16 businesses in this sector. There were 236 residents of the municipality who were employed in some capacity, of which females made up 42.4% of the workforce.

In 2000, there were 31 workers who commuted into the municipality and 179 workers who commuted away. The municipality is a net exporter of workers, with about 5.8 workers leaving the municipality for every one entering. About 22.6% of the workforce coming into Valcolla are coming from outside Switzerland. Of the working population, 6.8% used public transportation to get to work, and 70.8% used a private car.

As of 2009, there was one hotel in Valcolla.

== Religion ==
From the 2000 census, 453 or 81.2% were Roman Catholic, while 27 or 4.8% belonged to the Swiss Reformed Church. There are 50 individuals (or about 8.96% of the population) who belong to another church (not listed on the census), and 28 individuals (or about 5.02% of the population) did not answer the question.

== Education ==
In Valcolla about 73% of the population (between age 25-64) have completed either non-mandatory upper secondary education or additional higher education (either university or a Fachhochschule).

In Valcolla there were a total of 98 students (as of 2009). The Ticino education system provides up to three years of non-mandatory kindergarten and in Valcolla there were 18 children in kindergarten. The primary school program lasts for five years and includes both a standard school and a special school. In the municipality, 30 students attended the standard primary schools and 1 student attended the special school. In the lower secondary school system, students either attend a two-year middle school followed by a two-year pre-apprenticeship or they attend a four-year program to prepare for higher education. There were 27 students in the two-year middle school, while 6 students were in the four-year advanced program.

The upper secondary school includes several options, but at the end of the upper secondary program, a student will be prepared to enter a trade or to continue on to a university or college. In Ticino, vocational students may either attend school while working on their internship or apprenticeship (which takes three or four years) or may attend school followed by an internship or apprenticeship (which takes one year as a full-time student or one and a half to two years as a part-time student). There were 7 vocational students who were attending school full-time and 8 who attend part-time.

The professional program lasts three years and prepares a student for a job in engineering, nursing, computer science, business, tourism and similar fields. There was 1 student in the professional program.

As of 2000, there were 43 students from Valcolla who attended schools outside the municipality.
