= Giuseppe Antonio Petrini =

18th-century Italian painter

Giuseppe Antonio Petrini (23 October 1677 - c. 1755–9) was a painter of the late-Baroque, active mainly in Lugano, present-day Switzerland.

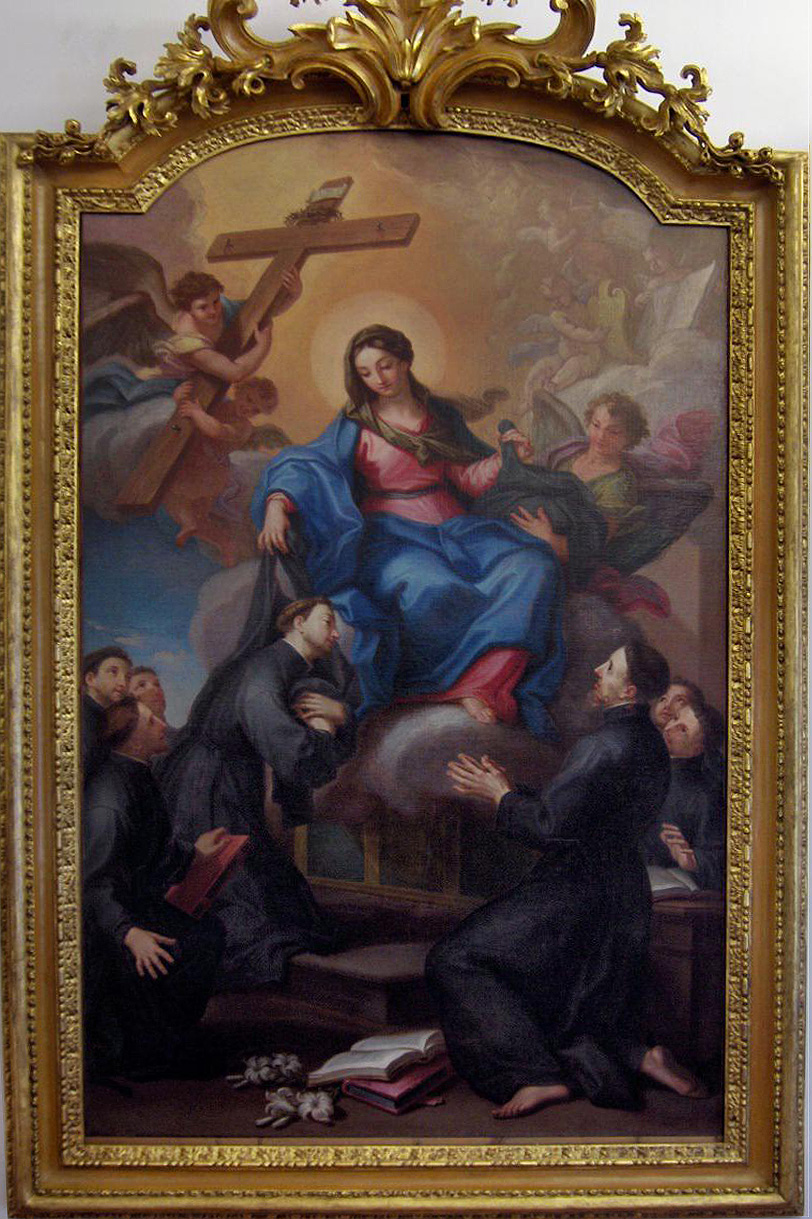
St. Andrew City Museum of Rimini, Italy

While born in Carona in Canton Ticino and died in Lugano, both in Switzerland, Petrini belongs to the Northern Italian or Lombard heritage of baroque painting. He possibly apprenticed with Bartolomeo Guidobono after 1700. While some works can be found in Como and Bergamo, most are located in Lugano and the surrounding area. He is also listed between 1711 and 1753 as fabbriciere of the church of Madonna d’Onegro in Carona. He often painted "portraits" of historical figures including saints, philosophers, and scientists for patrons. One of his more prominent examples is his depiction of an austere St. Peter emerging from the shadows to pinpoint some lines in the gospel. He painted another St. Peter for the parish church of Dubino. Pietro Ligari classified him among the speculative painters, since these portraits, by nature, were imagined.

== Sources ==
- Grove Art Encyclopedia biography
- Settecento Lombardo. Milan, Palazzo Reale, Giovanna Perini. The Burlington Magazine (1991); p. 340.
