= Cimadera =

- Former municipality
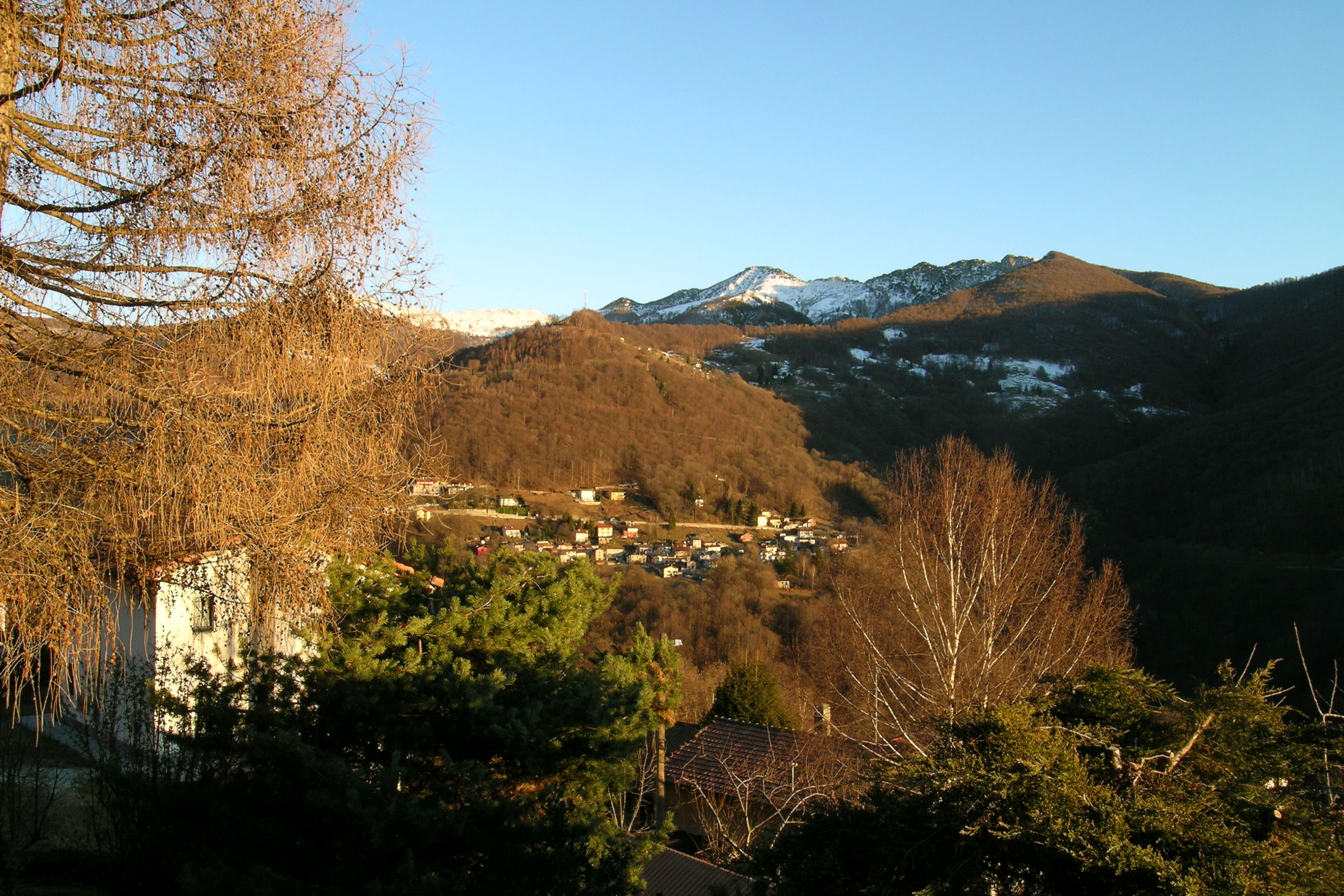

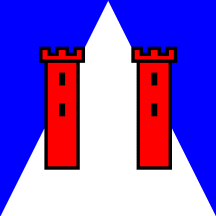
- Flag Coat of arms
- Location of Cimadera
- Location within Switzerland Location within Canton of Ticino
- Coordinates: 46°5′N 9°3′E
- Country: Switzerland
- Canton: Ticino
- District: Lugano

Area
  - Total: 5.28 km^{2} (2.04 sq mi)
- Elevation: 1,084 m (3,556 ft)

Population (Dec 2011)
  - Total: 115
  - Density: 21.8/km^{2} (56.4/sq mi)
- Time zone: UTC+01:00 (CET)
  - Summer (DST): UTC+02:00 (CEST)
- Postal code: 6951
- SFOS number: 5174
- ISO 3166 code: CH-TI
- Surrounded by: Certara, Sonvico, Valcolla, Val Rezzo (Italy), Valsolda (Italy)
- Website: SFSO statistics

Cimadera is a former municipality in the district of Lugano in the canton of Ticino in Switzerland. On 14 April 2013 the former municipalities of Bogno, Cadro, Carona, Certara, Cimadera, Valcolla and Sonvico merged into the municipality of Lugano.

== History ==
Cimadera is first mentioned in 1422 as cima d'Era. The village was originally an alpine herding camp for the inhabitants of the village Treciore which was part of the town of Sonvico. After the plague of 1525, they settled there permanently. In the 16th century it belonged to the Kastlanei and parish of Sonvico. In 1878 the municipality was created when it separated from Sonvico to become an independent municipality and parish.

The chapel of St. Anthony of Padua dates from the 17th century. The prayer house of S. Maria ed Elisabetta or della Visitazione was built in 1670.

The income of the village was dominated by farming and cattle breeding, but was supplemented by income from seasonal emigration. The decline of agriculture and the urbanization of the villages surrounding Lugano, since the beginning of the 20th century, have depopulated the town. Many houses have been converted into second or vacation homes.

== Geography ==
Before the merger, Cimadera had a total area of 5.2 km^{2} (2.0 mi^{2}). Of this area, 0.31 km^{2} (0.12 sq mi) or 5.9% is used for agricultural purposes, while 4.4 km^{2} (1.7 sq mi) or 83.3% is forested. Of the rest of the land, 0.09 km^{2} (22 acres) or 1.7% is settled (buildings or roads) and 0.21 km^{2} (0.081 sq mi) or 4.0% is unproductive land.

Of the built up area, housing and buildings made up 0.6% and transportation infrastructure made up 0.8%. Out of the forested land, 76.3% of the total land area is heavily forested and 3.6% is covered with orchards or small clusters of trees. Of the agricultural land, 5.3% is used for growing crops. Of the unproductive areas, 3.4% is unproductive vegetation and .

The former municipality is located in the Lugano district, on the left slope of the upper Val Colla at an elevation of 1,100 m (3,600 ft).

== Coat of arms ==
The blazon of the municipal coat of arms is "Per cevron reaching the chief azure and argent overall two towers gules."

== Demographics ==
Cimadera had a population (as of 2011) of 115. As of 2008, 5.8% of the population are resident foreign nationals. Over the last 10 years (1997–2007) the population has changed at a rate of 17.3%.

Most of the population (as of 2000) speaks Italian (85.0%), with German being second most common (10.0%) and French being third (2.0%). Of the Swiss national languages (as of 2000), 10 speak German, 2 people speak French, 85 people speak Italian. The remainder (3 people) speak another language.

As of 2008, the gender distribution of the population was 51.5% male and 48.5% female. The population was made up of 62 Swiss men (47.7% of the population), and 5 (3.8%) non-Swiss men. There were 60 Swiss women (46.2%), and 3 (2.3%) non-Swiss women.

In 2008 there were 2 live births to Swiss citizens and were 3 deaths of Swiss citizens. Ignoring immigration and emigration, the population of Swiss citizens decreased by 1 while the foreign population remained the same. There was 1 Swiss man who immigrated back to Switzerland. The total Swiss population change in 2008 (from all sources, including moves across municipal borders) was an increase of 4 and the non-Swiss population change was an increase of 1 people. This represents a population growth rate of 4.3%.

The age distribution, as of 2009, in Cimadera is; 7 children or 5.4% of the population are between 0 and 9 years old and 8 teenagers or 6.2% are between 10 and 19. Of the adult population, 13 people or 10.0% of the population are between 20 and 29 years old. 13 people or 10.0% are between 30 and 39, 30 people or 23.1% are between 40 and 49, and 18 people or 13.8% are between 50 and 59. The senior population distribution is 22 people or 16.9% of the population are between 60 and 69 years old, 8 people or 6.2% are between 70 and 79, there are 11 people or 8.5% who are over 80.

As of 2000, there were 55 private households in the municipality, and an average of 1.8 persons per household. In 2000 there were 156 single family homes (or 89.7% of the total) out of a total of 174 inhabited buildings. There were 15 two family buildings (8.6%) and 2 multi-family buildings (1.1%). There was 1 building in the municipality that was a multipurpose buildings (used for both housing and commercial or another purpose).

The vacancy rate for the municipality, in 2008, was 0%. In 2000 there were 190 apartments in the municipality. The most common apartment size was the 3 room apartment of which there were 70. There were 16 single room apartments and 25 apartments with five or more rooms. Of these apartments, a total of 53 apartments (27.9% of the total) were permanently occupied, while 136 apartments (71.6%) were seasonally occupied and 1 apartments (0.5%) were empty. As of 2007, the construction rate of new housing units was 0 new units per 1000 residents.

The historical population is given in the following chart:

== Sights ==
The entire village of Cimadera is designated as part of the Inventory of Swiss Heritage Sites

== Politics ==
In the 2007 federal election the most popular party was the SVP which received 45.19% of the vote. The next three most popular parties were the SP (15.95%), the CVP (14.31%) and the Ticino League (10.63%). In the federal election, a total of 63 votes were cast, and the voter turnout was 51.2%.

In the 2007 Gran Consiglio election, there were a total of 121 registered voters in Cimadera, of which 81 or 66.9% voted. The most popular party was the UDC which received 32 or 39.5% of the vote. The next three most popular parties were; the SSI (with 15 or 18.5%), the PPD+GenGiova (with 12 or 14.8%) and the PS (with 8 or 9.9%).

In the 2007 Consiglio di Stato election, 1 blank ballot was cast, leaving 80 valid ballots in the election. The most popular party was the PPD which received 37 or 46.3% of the vote. The next three most popular parties were; the PS (with 13 or 16.3%), the LEGA (with 11 or 13.8%) and the SSI (with 9 or 11.3%).

== Economy ==
As of 2007, Cimadera had an unemployment rate of 3.25%. As of 2005, there were 3 people employed in the primary economic sector and about 2 businesses involved in this sector. 6 people were employed in the secondary sector and there were 3 businesses in this sector. 3 people were employed in the tertiary sector, with 2 businesses in this sector. There were 38 residents of the municipality who were employed in some capacity, of which females made up 36.8% of the workforce.

In 2000, there were 5 workers who commuted into the municipality and 29 workers who commuted away. The municipality is a net exporter of workers, with about 5.8 workers leaving the municipality for every one entering. Of the working population, 5.3% used public transportation to get to work, and 78.9% used a private car.

== Religion ==
From the 2000 census, 79 or 79.0% were Roman Catholic, while 9 or 9.0% belonged to the Swiss Reformed Church. There are 10 individuals (or about 10.00% of the population) who belong to another church (not listed on the census), and 2 individuals (or about 2.00% of the population) did not answer the question.

== Education ==
The entire Swiss population is generally well educated. In Cimadera about 75.8% of the population (between age 25-64) have completed either non-mandatory upper secondary education or additional higher education (either University or a Fachhochschule).

In Cimadera there were a total of 10 students (as of 2009). The Ticino education system provides up to three years of non-mandatory kindergarten and five years of mandatory primary school. In the municipality, 3 students attended the standard primary schools. In the lower secondary school system, students either attend a two-year middle school followed by a two-year pre-apprenticeship or they attend a four-year program to prepare for higher education. There were 2 students in the two-year middle school, while 0 students were in the four-year advanced program.

The upper secondary school includes several options, but at the end of the upper secondary program, a student will be prepared to enter a trade or to continue on to a university or college. In Ticino, vocational students may either attend school while working on their internship or apprenticeship (which takes three or four years) or may attend school followed by an internship or apprenticeship (which takes one year as a full-time student or one and a half to two years as a part-time student). There was 1 vocational student who was attending school full-time and 4 who attend part-time.

As of 2000, there were 6 students from Cimadera who attended schools outside the municipality.
