= Cavargna =

- Comune
- Comune di Cavargna
- Location within Italy Location within Lombardy
- Coordinates: 46°5′N 9°7′E
- Country: Italy
- Region: Lombardy
- Province: Province of Como (CO)
- Frazioni: Vegna, Mondrago, Segalè

Area
  - Total: 15.1 km^{2} (5.8 sq mi)

Population (Dec. 2004)
  - Total: 296
  - Density: 19.6/km^{2} (50.8/sq mi)
- Demonym: Cavargnoni
- Time zone: UTC+1 (CET)
  - Summer (DST): UTC+2 (CEST)
- Postal code: 22010
- Dialing code: 0344

Cavargna is a comune (municipality) in the Province of Como in the Italian region Lombardy, located about 70 kilometres (43 mi) north of Milan and about 30 kilometres (19 mi) north of Como, on the border with Switzerland. As of 31 December 2004, it had a population of 296 and an area of 15.1 square kilometres (5.8 mi^{2}).

The municipality of Cavargna contains the frazioni (subdivisions, mainly villages and hamlets) Vegna, Mondrago, and Segalè.

Cavargna borders the following municipalities: Bogno (Switzerland), Ponte Capriasca (Switzerland), San Nazzaro Val Cavargna, Sant'Antonio (Switzerland), Valcolla (Switzerland), Val Rezzo.

== Demographic evolution ==
Historical population

Year	Pop.	±%
1861	456	—
1871	504	+10.5%
1881	510	+1.2%
1901	592	+16.1%
1911	681	+15.0%

Year	Pop.	±%
1921	687	+0.9%
1931	716	+4.2%
1936	704	−1.7%
1951	676	−4.0%
1961	638	−5.6%

Year	Pop.	±%
1971	537	−15.8%
1981	457	−14.9%
1991	382	−16.4%
2001	315	−17.5%

Source: Data from ISTAT
