= Sonvico =

- Quarter
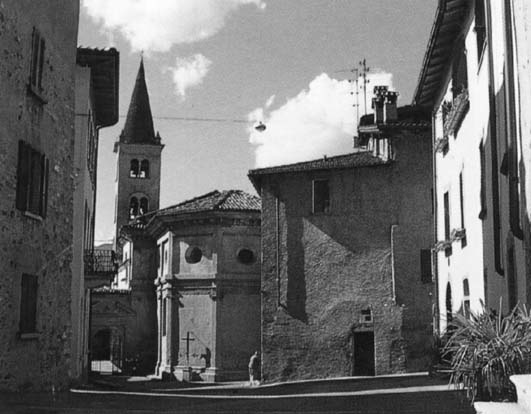

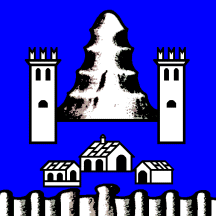
- Flag Coat of arms

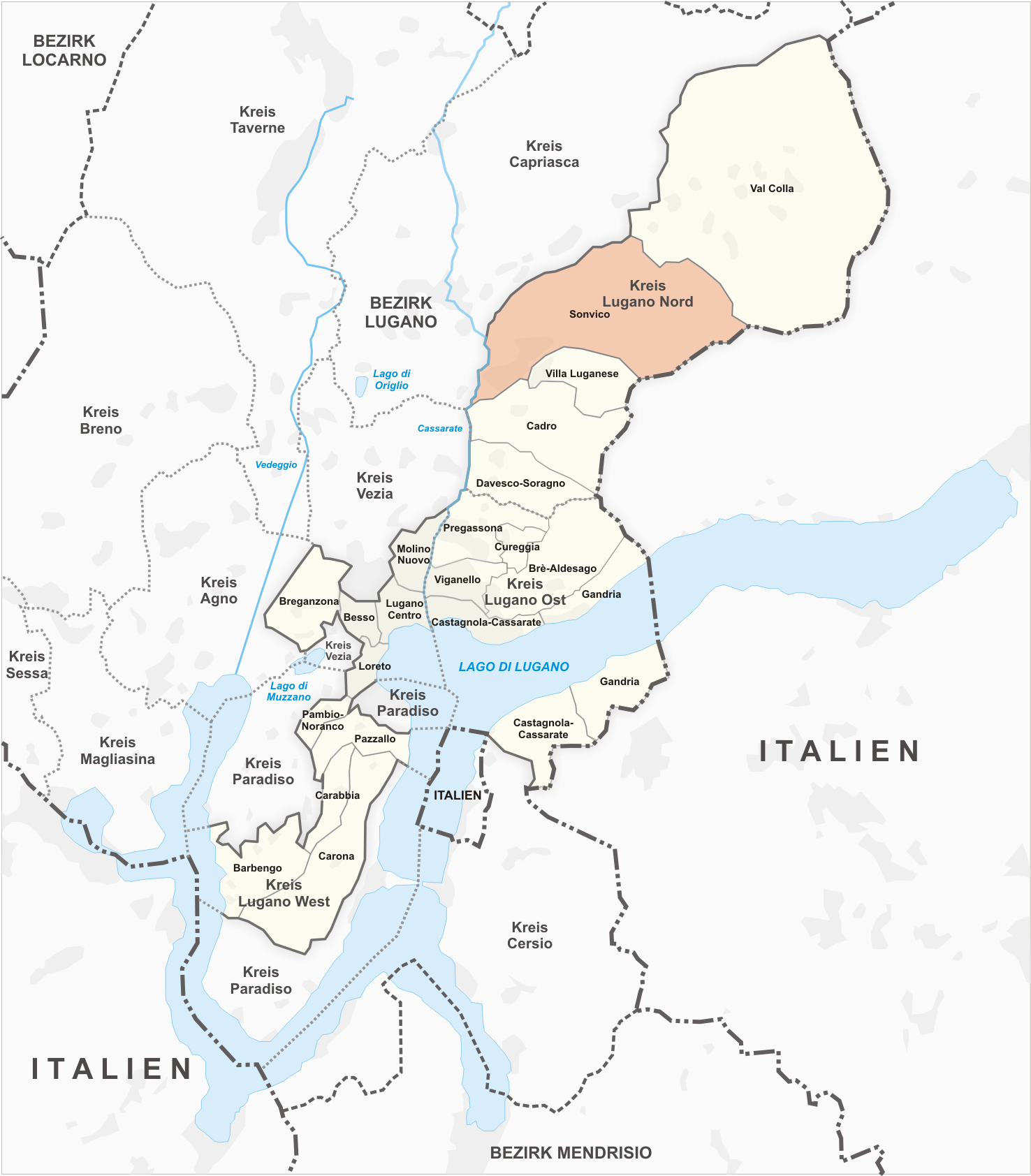

- Location within Switzerland
- Coordinates: 46°03′N 8°59′E
- Country: Switzerland
- Canton: Ticino
- District: Lugano
- City: Lugano

Area
  - Total: 11.09 km^{2} (4.28 sq mi)
- Elevation: 603 m (1,978 ft)

Population (2010-12-31)
  - Total: 1,837
  - Density: 165.6/km^{2} (429.0/sq mi)
- Postal code: 6968
- SFOS number: 5224
- ISO 3166 code: CH-TI
- Surrounded by: Cadro, Capriasca, Cimadera, Lugano, Valcolla, Valsolda (IT-CO)

Sonvico (Sonvìch in the Lombard language) is a quarter of the city of Lugano and former municipality of the Lugano district in the canton of Ticino in Switzerland. On 14 April 2013 the municipality of Sonvico merged into the municipality of Lugano becoming a new neighborhood. The medieval part of Sonvico village consists of an old citadel with a compacted structure full of narrow and intricate lanes.

== History ==
Sonvico is first mentioned in 1040 as Summo Vico, from the Latin "Summus Vicus", meaning "the higher located village"

Prehistoric settlement in the area are proved by the findings of a Golasecca culture grave and a plate with a northern Etruscan inscription. During the archaeologic explorations in the San Martino church, Roman and Lombard objects (including a woman's grave with a cross brooch from about 650-700 AD) were discovered. From around the 9th to 10th centuries, the villages of Sonvico, Dino and Villa (later the municipality Villa Lugano, now part of Lugano) formed a community.

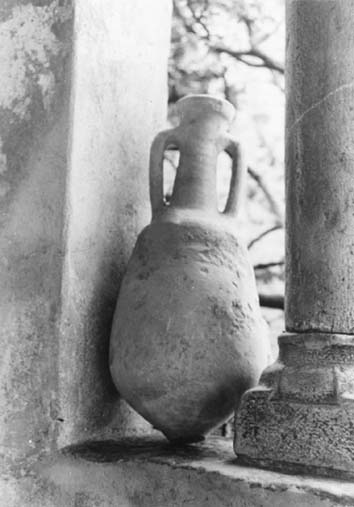
Roman amphora found in Sonvico

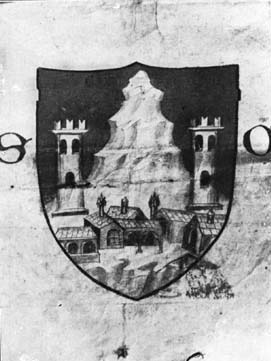
Original coat of arms donated by the Duchy of Milan in the 15th century

=== The Castellanza ===
In 1326 was testified that Sonvico and neighbors merged into a community known as The Castellanza. During the 16th century, the village of Cimadera joined The Castellanza. Sonvico was strategically located on top of Lugano valley, which was a necessary passage to the Nordic versant of the Alps, through the Gotthard Pass. Additionally, it was strongly fortified with a ring wall and a castle, which was built before 1326 and renovated around the end of the 15th century. These qualities made the Castellanza a strategic base for the House of Visconti and the House of Sforza of the Duchy of Milan until the Battle of Novara (1513). Due to its importance, Sonvico obtained a privilege status from the Duchy and was thus allowed to set many of its own laws enjoying tax and customs exemptions. The first book of law known as "Libbro degli Statuti della Magnifica Comunità di Sonvico" dates from 1473. During the Italian War of 1499–1504 the Swiss took power over the Ticino region and The Castellanza was officially annexed by the Old Swiss Confederacy into their occupied territories in 1512. The village resisted for a while isolated, and only after the signing of a pact for the maintenance of the old privileges respected by the Duchy, ceded its sovereignty to the Swiss. The Swiss accepted the pact, but posed as condition the castle destruction. The Castle was finally destroyed by its inhabitants in 1517. Although the privileges were guaranteed by the pact, their maintenance was only partly respected and the Castellanza felt betrayed by the Swiss.

=== Chestnut-based economy ===
The local economy was based on crops (mainly of chestnut), viticulture and animal husbandry. Sonvico was almost completely self-sufficient and during the centuries developed a chestnut based economy: common in the area. The crops - today still visible - are property of the community and their exploitation was ruled under the right of the old Sonvico's families: a public organization today known as Patriziato(official page). The chestnut based economy of Sonvico lasted until the introduction of the potato and the crop's exploitation lasted until the Second World War and over.

=== Recent history ===
Due to limited farming land many residents emigrated abroad seeking job opportunities generally as construction craftsmen and masons. Initially, emigration was limited to the neighboring European countries, but starting from the 19th century, The United States and Argentina were the main destinations. At the beginning of the 20th century, some tourist hotels opened in the village and between 1911 and 1979 a regional train line connecting Lugano and Sonvico was in operation. During the economic boom of the 1950s and 1960s new residential buildings were built in the area. Nowadays Sonvico is a residential quarter and the surrounding agricultural lands have mainly become forest. In 2000, around 80% of the workforce were commuters, working for the service sector, around the area of Lugano. Sonvico community restored or renovated many of its historical symbolic buildings.

- The old wine-walnut press building (Torchio delle Noci) was renovated in 1983,
- The old communal water-mill situated in the Franscinone Valley was renovated during the 90s.
- The old administrative building (Casa della Ragione) renovated in 2012
- The main Church of San Giovanni Battista in Corcaréi renovated in 1997-1998

== Geography ==
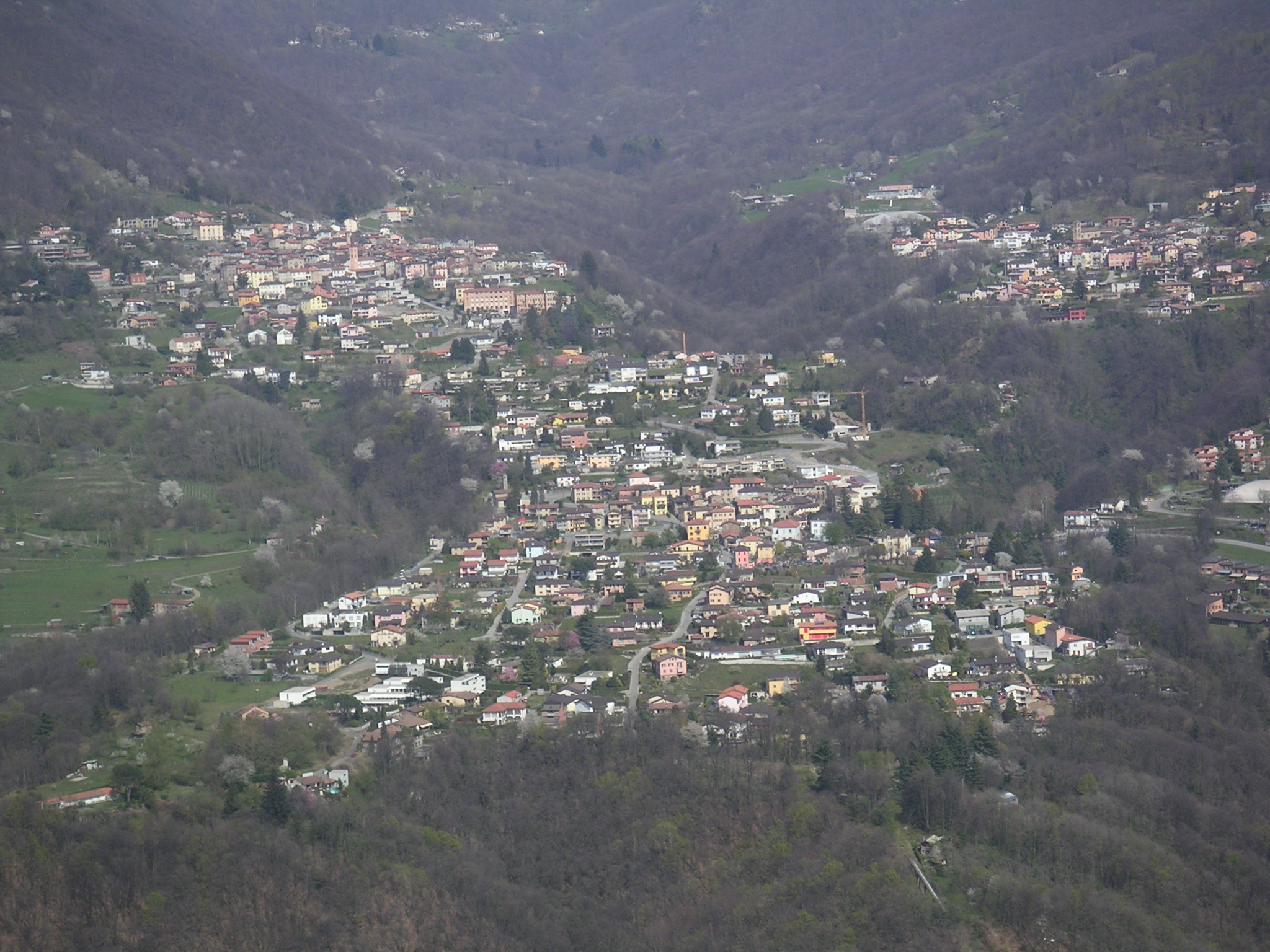
Sonvico

Aerial view (1948)

Before the merger, Sonvico had a total area of 11.1 km^{2} (4.3 mi^{2}). Of this area, 1.34 km^{2} (0.52 sq mi) or 12.1% is used for agricultural purposes, while 8.86 km^{2} (3.42 sq mi) or 80.1% is forested. Of the rest of the land, 0.74 km^{2} (0.29 sq mi) or 6.7% is settled (buildings or roads), 0.02 km^{2} (4.9 acres) or 0.2% is either rivers or lakes and 0.42 km^{2} (0.16 sq mi) or 3.8% is unproductive land.

Of the built up area, housing and buildings made up 4.6% and transportation infrastructure made up 1.2%. Out of the forested land, 76.7% of the total land area is heavily forested and 3.3% is covered with orchards or small clusters of trees. Of the agricultural land, 7.0% is used for growing crops and 4.6% is used for alpine pastures. All the water in the municipality is flowing water.

The quarter is located in the northern edge of the Cassarate valley. It consists of the village of Sonvico and the large village section of Dino, which has about 600 inhabitants. Until 1878 it also included the village of Cimadera.

== Coat of arms ==
The blazon of the municipal coat of arms is Gules a saltire argent and in chief tower of the same. The St. Andrew cross refers to the patron saint of the church." The Castellanza's coat of arms was a white unicorn in a blue background. It is still visible in the "Casa della ragione" entrance fresco, in the main square "Piazza Grande". The current municipal blazon was donated by the milan Sforza's family in the 15th century.

== Demographics ==
Sonvico had a population (as of 2011) of 1,852. As of 2008, 9.2% of the population are resident foreign nationals. Over the last 10 years (1997–2007) the population has changed at a rate of 19.5%.

Most of the population (as of 2000) speaks Italian (90.1%), with German being second most common (5.1%) and French being third (2.6%). Of the Swiss national languages (as of 2000), 82 speak German, 42 people speak French, 1,442 people speak Italian. The remainder (34 people) speak another language.

As of 2008, the gender distribution of the population was 48.9% male and 51.1% female. The population was made up of 797 Swiss men (43.1% of the population), and 107 (5.8%) non-Swiss men. There were 872 Swiss women (47.2%), and 72 (3.9%) non-Swiss women.

In 2008 there were 18 live births to Swiss citizens and were 10 deaths of Swiss citizens and 1 non-Swiss citizen death. Ignoring immigration and emigration, the population of Swiss citizens increased by 8 while the foreign population decreased by 1. There were 2 Swiss men who immigrated back to Switzerland. At the same time, there were 5 non-Swiss men and 1 non-Swiss woman who immigrated from another country to Switzerland. The total Swiss population change in 2008 (from all sources, including moves across municipal borders) was an increase of 13 and the non-Swiss population change was an increase of 12 people. This represents a population growth rate of 1.4%.

The age distribution, as of 2009, in Sonvico is; 183 children or 9.9% of the population are between 0 and 9 years old and 209 teenagers or 11.3% are between 10 and 19. Of the adult population, 149 people or 8.1% of the population are between 20 and 29 years old. 264 people or 14.3% are between 30 and 39, 330 people or 17.9% are between 40 and 49, and 243 people or 13.1% are between 50 and 59. The senior population distribution is 211 people or 11.4% of the population are between 60 and 69 years old, 160 people or 8.7% are between 70 and 79, there are 99 people or 5.4% who are over 80.

As of 2000, there were 646 private households in Sonvico, and an average of 2.4 persons per household. In 2000 there were 624 single family homes (or 78.1% of the total) out of a total of 799 inhabited buildings. There were 108 two family buildings (13.5%) and 49 multi-family buildings (6.1%). There were also 18 buildings in the village that were multipurpose buildings (used for both housing and commercial or another purpose).

The vacancy rate for Sonvico, in 2008, was 1.17%. In 2000 there were 1,034 apartments in the quarter. The most common apartment size was the 4 room apartment of which there were 323. There were 80 single room apartments and 270 apartments with five or more rooms. Of these apartments, a total of 645 apartments (62.4% of the total) were permanently occupied, while 369 apartments (35.7%) were seasonally occupied and 20 apartments (1.9%) were empty. As of 2007, the construction rate of new housing units was 5.5 new units per 1000 residents.

The historical population is given in the following chart:

== Heritage sites of national significance ==
The Provost's Church of S. Giovanni Battista a Corcaréi and the Oratory of S. Martino are listed as Swiss heritage sites of national significance. The entire village of Sonvico is listed in the Inventory of Swiss Heritage Sites.

== Politics ==
In the 2007 federal election the most popular party was the CVP which received 24.51% of the vote. The next three most popular parties were the Ticino League (22.26%), the SP (18.32%) and the FDP (18.15%). In the federal election, a total of 666 votes were cast, and the voter turnout was 49.9%.

In the 2007 Gran Consiglio election, there were a total of 1,333 registered voters in Sonvico, of which 848 or 63.6% voted. 10 blank ballots and 3 null ballots were cast, leaving 835 valid ballots in the election. The most popular party was the LEGA which received 191 or 22.9% of the vote. The next three most popular parties were; the PLRT (with 150 or 18.0%), the PS (with 140 or 16.8%) and the PPD+GenGiova (with 134 or 16.0%).

In the 2007 Consiglio di Stato election, 14 blank ballots and 2 null ballots were cast, leaving 834 valid ballots in the election. The most popular party was the LEGA which received 259 or 31.1% of the vote. The next three most popular parties were; the PS (with 158 or 18.9%), the PLRT (with 130 or 15.6%) and the PPD (with 123 or 14.7%).

== Economy ==
As of 2007, Sonvico had an unemployment rate of 2.86%. As of 2005, there were 15 people employed in the primary economic sector and about 6 businesses involved in this sector. 62 people were employed in the secondary sector and there were 16 businesses in this sector. 148 people were employed in the tertiary sector, with 26 businesses in this sector. There were 703 residents of the quarter who were employed in some capacity, of which females made up 38.7% of the workforce.

In 2000, there were 187 workers who commuted into the quarter and 563 workers who commuted away. Sonvico is a net exporter of workers, with about 3.0 workers leaving the district for every one entering. About 25.7% of the workforce coming into Sonvico are coming from outside Switzerland, while 0.0% of the locals commute out of Switzerland for work. Of the working population, 10.7% used public transportation to get to work, and 67.9% used a private car.

== Religion ==
From the 2000 census, 1,275 or 79.7% were Roman Catholic, while 102 or 6.4% belonged to the Swiss Reformed Church. There are 170 individuals (or about 10.63% of the population) who belong to another church (not listed on the census), and 53 individuals (or about 3.31% of the population) did not answer the question.

== Education ==
In Sonvico about 78.8% of the population (between age 25–64) have completed either non-mandatory upper secondary education or additional higher education (either university or a SUPSI.

In Sonvico there were a total of 328 students (as of 2009). The Ticino education system provides up to three years of non-mandatory kindergarten and in Sonvico there were 48 children in kindergarten. The primary school program lasts for five years and includes both a standard school and a special school. In the quarter, 94 students attended the standard primary schools and 3 students attended the special school. In the lower secondary school system, students either attend a two-year middle school followed by a two-year pre-apprenticeship or they attend a four-year program to prepare for higher education. There were 86 students in the two-year middle school, while 43 students were in the four-year advanced program.

The upper secondary school includes several options, but at the end of the upper secondary program, a student will be prepared to enter a trade or to continue on to a university or college. In Ticino, vocational students may either attend school while working on their internship or apprenticeship (which takes three or four years) or may attend school followed by an internship or apprenticeship (which takes one year as a full-time student or one and a half to two years as a part-time student). There were 22 vocational students who were attending school full-time and 23 who attend part-time.

The professional program lasts three years and prepares a student for a job in engineering, nursing, computer science, business, tourism and similar fields. There were 9 students in the professional program.

As of 2000, there were 5 students in Sonvico who came from another municipality, while 132 residents attended schools outside the quarter.
