= Municipalities of the canton of Ticino =

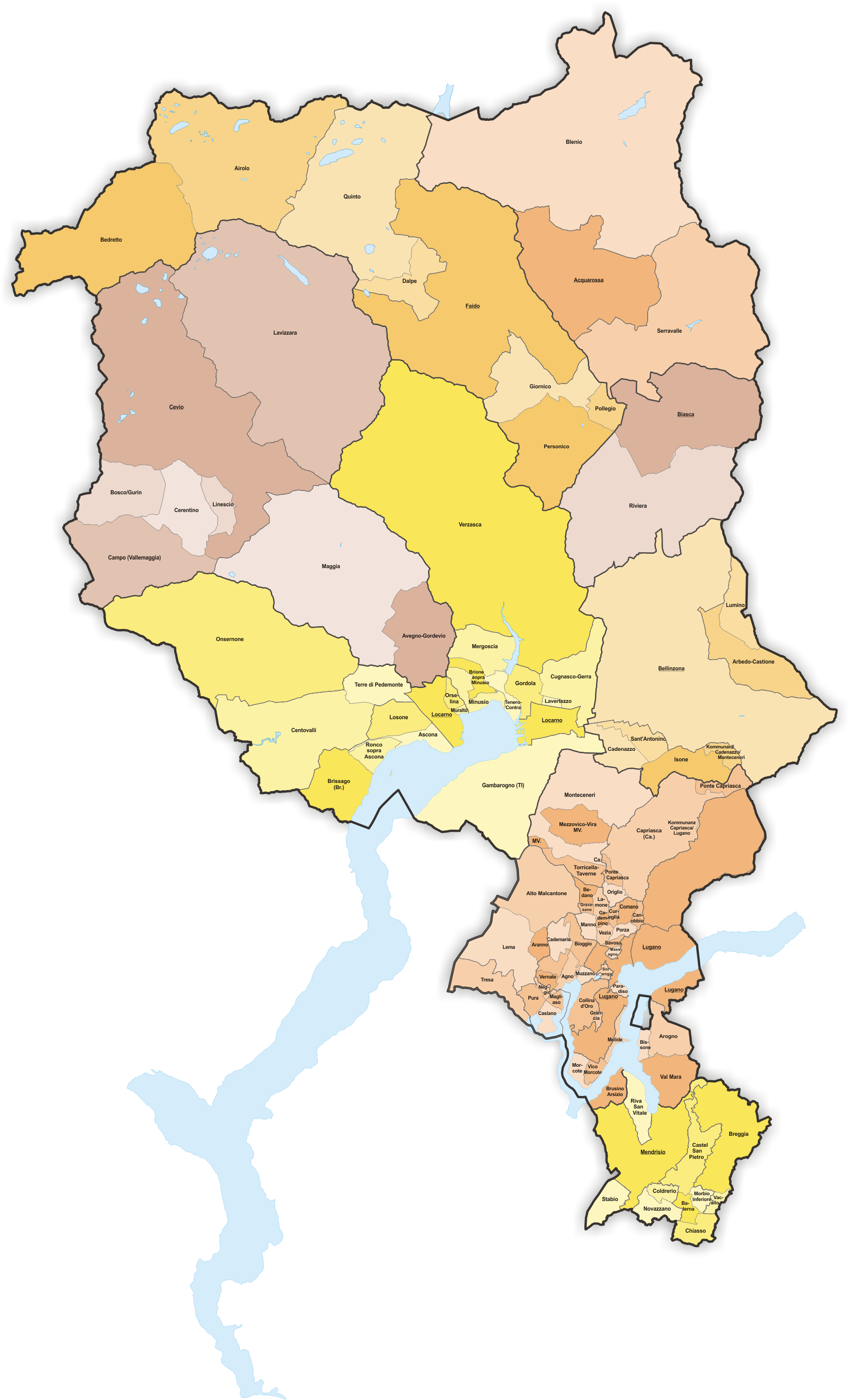
Municipalities in the canton of Ticino

There are 100 municipalities in the canton of Ticino, Switzerland, (as of April 2025). Municipalities (comuni) are grouped in circles (circoli) which are part of districts (distretti).

== List ==
- Acquarossa
- Agno
- Airolo
- Alto Malcantone
- Aranno
- Arbedo-Castione
- Arogno
- Ascona
- Avegno Gordevio
- Balerna
- Bedano
- Bedretto
- Bellinzona
- Biasca
- Bioggio
- Bissone
- Blenio
- Bosco/Gurin
- Breggia
- Brione sopra Minusio
- Brissago
- Brusino Arsizio
- Cademario
- Cadempino
- Cadenazzo
- Campo (Vallemaggia)
- Canobbio
- Capriasca
- Caslano
- Castel San Pietro
- Centovalli
- Cerentino
- Cevio
- Chiasso
- Coldrerio
- Collina d'Oro
- Comano
- Cugnasco-Gerra
- Cureglia
- Dalpe
- Faido
- Gambarogno
- Gordola
- Grancia
- Gravesano
- Isone
- Lamone
- Lavertezzo
- Lavizzara
- Lema
- Linescio
- Locarno
- Losone
- Lugano
- Lumino
- Maggia
- Magliaso
- Manno
- Massagno
- Melide
- Mendrisio
- Mergoscia
- Mezzovico-Vira
- Minusio
- Monteceneri
- Morbio Inferiore
- Morcote
- Muralto
- Muzzano
- Neggio
- Novazzano
- Onsernone
- Origlio
- Orselina
- Paradiso
- Personico
- Pollegio
- Ponte Capriasca
- Porza
- Prato (Leventina)
- Pura
- Quinto
- Riva San Vitale
- Riviera
- Ronco sopra Ascona
- Sant'Antonino
- Savosa
- Serravalle
- Sorengo
- Stabio
- Tenero-Contra
- Terre di Pedemonte
- Torricella-Taverne
- Tresa
- Vacallo
- Val Mara
- Vernate
- Verzasca
- Vezia
- Vico Morcote

== Changes ==
Number of municipalities
| 01.01.1995 | 245 |
| 15.04.2001 | 243 |
| 15.10.2001 | 238 |
| 01.04.2004 | 204 |
| 14.03.2005 | 199 |
| 29.01.2006 | 196 |
| 22.10.2006 | 190 |
| 20.04.2008 | 181 |
| 05.04.2009 | 176 |
| 25.10.2009 | 169 |
| 25.04.2010 | 161 |
| 21.11.2010 | 157 |
| 01.04.2012 | 147 |
| 14.04.2013 | 135 |
| 10.04.2016 | 130 |
| 15.06.2021 | 108 |

In last centuries there were many changes (renaming, merges, splits) of municipalities. The following list enumerates all the changes, with the official (published) date (the new authorities are elected after some time, so sometime there are some other date). Changes from 25 June 1803:

- Unknown - Niva and Cimalmotto merged in the new municipality of Campo (Vallemaggia).
- Unknown - Pontirone, Loderio and Biasca merged in the municipality of Biasca.
- 1830 - Prosito Lodrino merged in the municipality of Lodrino.
- 23 November 1831 - Pianezzo, Sant'Antonio and Vallemorobbia in Piano separated themselves from Vallemorobbia
- 1836 - Bottino and Ghirone merged in the municipality of Ghirone
- 9 May 1853 - Campello separated itself from Calpiogna
- 2 December 1867 - Vallemorobbia in Piano and Giubiasco merged in the municipality of Giubiasco.
- 24 January 1882 - Gresso separated itself from Vergeletto
- 1904 - Pambio and Noranco merged in the municipality of Pambio-Noranco
- 20 November 1907 - Carasso, Ravecchia, Daro and Bellinzona merged in the municipality of Bellinzona.
- 1925 - Bioggio, Biogno and Molino merged in the municipality of Bioggio
- 1925 -- Biogno Villaggio, Lucino and Breganzona merged in the municipality of Breganzona
- 15 November 1927 - Grumo and Torre merged in the municipality of Torre.
- 8 May 1928 - Solduno and Locarno merged in the municipality of Locarno.
- 12 July 1929 - Calprino is renamed Paradiso.
- 12 July 1929 - Casenzano and Vairano merged in the municipality of San Nazzaro.
- 10 June 1936 - Mogno and Fusio merged in the municipality of Fusio.
- 15 October 1956 - Colla, Isone, Piandera, Scareglia and Signôra merged in the new municipality of Valcolla
- 14 December 1971 - Lugano, Castagnola and Brè-Aldesago merged in the municipality of Lugano
- 6 March 1972 - Rasa and Intragna merged in the municipality of Intragna
- 26 November 1974 - Biogno-Beride and Croglio-Castelrotto merged in the new municipality of Croglio
- 26 November 1974 - Campestro and Tesserete merged in the municipality of Tesserete
- 24 November 1975 - Pedrinate and Chiasso merged in the municipality of Chiasso
- 27 June 1994 - Crana, Comologno and Russo merged in the new municipality of Onsernone
- 6 June 2000 - Tesserete, Cagiallo, Sala Capriasca, Lopagno, Roveredo Capriasca and Vaglio merged in the new municipality of Capriasca.
- 21 January 2001 - Auressio, Berzona and Loco merged in the new municipality of Isorno
- 8 October 2003 - Mendrisio and Salorino are merged in the municipality of Mendrisio.
- 8 October 2003 - Aurigeno, Coglio, Giumaglio, Lodano, Maggia, Mogheno and Someo merged in the municipality of Maggia.
- 8 October 2003 - Broglio, Brontallo, Fusio, Menzonio, Peccia and Prato-Sornico merged in the new municipality of Lavizzara.
- 8 October 2003 - Castro, Corzoneso, Dongio, Largario, Leontica, Lottigna, Marolta, Ponto Valentino and Prugiasco merged in the municipality of Acquarossa.
- 3 November 2003 - Agra, Gentilino and Montagnola are merged in the new municipality of Collina d'Oro.
- 3 November 2003 - Bioggio, Bosco Luganese and Cimo merged in the municipality of Bioggio.
- 24 November 2003 - Casima, Castel San Pietro, Monte and Campora (part of Caneggio) are merged in the municipality of Castel San Pietro.
- 24 November 2003 - Breganzona, Lugano, Pambio-Noranco and Pazzallo merged in the municipality of Lugano.
- 24 November 2003- Cureggia, Davesco-Soragno, Gandria, Lugano, Pregassona and Viganello merged in the municipality of Lugano.
- 20 November 2004 - Arosio, Breno, Fescoggia, Mugena e Vezio merged in the new municipality of Alto Malcantone.
- 30 November 2004 - Cadenazzo and Robasacco merged in the municipality of Cadenazzo.
- 26 January 2006 - Faido, Calonico, Chiggiogna and Rossura merged in the new municipality of Faido.
- 22 October 2006 - Aquila, Campo Blenio, Ghirone, Olivone and Torre merged in the new municipality of Blenio.
- 22 October 2006 - Cevio, Bignasco and Cavergno merged in the municipality of Cevio.
- 20 April 2008 - Cugnasco and Gerra (Verzasca) merged in the new municipality of Cugnasco-Gerra.
- 20 April 2008 - Avegno and Gordevio merged in the new municipality of Avegno Gordevio.
- 20 April 2008 - Bidogno, Corticiasca, Lugaggia and Capriasca merged in the new municipality of Capriasca.
- 20 April 2008 - Iseo and Bioggio merged in the municipality of Bioggio.
- 20 April 2008 - Barbengo, Carabbia, Villa Luganese and Lugano merged in the municipality of Lugano.
- 5 April 2009 - Mendrisio, Arzo, Capolago, Genestrerio, Rancate and Tremona merged in the municipality of Mendrisio.
- 25 October 2009 - Borgnone, Intragna and Palagnedra merged in the new municipality of Centovalli.
- 25 October 2009 - Bruzella, Cabbio, Caneggio, Morbio Superiore, Muggio and Sagno merged in the new municipality of Breggia.
- 25 April 2010 - Caviano, Contone, Gerra Gambarogno, Indemini, Magadino, Piazzogna, San Nazzaro, Sant'Abbondio and Vira Gambarogno merged in the new municipality of Gambarogno.
- 21 November 2010 - Medeglia, Bironico, Camignolo, Rivera and Sigirino merged in the new municipality of Monteceneri.
- 1 April 2012 - Ludiano, Malvaglia and Semione merged in the new municipality of Serravalle.
- 1 April 2012 - Anzonico, Calpiogna, Campello, Cavagnago, Chironico, Faido, Mairengo and Osco merged in the municipality of Faido.
- 1 April 2012 - Carabietta and Collina d'Oro merged in the municipality of Collina d'Oro.
- 14 April 2013 - Cavigliano, Tegna and Verscio merged in the new municipality of Terre di Pedemonte.
- 14 April 2013 - Bogno, Cadro, Carona, Certara, Cimadera, Lugano, Sonvico and Valcolla merged in the municipality of Lugano.
- 14 April 2013 - Besazio, Ligornetto, Mendrisio and Meride merged in the municipality of Mendrisio.
- 10 April 2016 - Faido and Sobrio merged in the municipality of Faido.
- 10 April 2016 - Gresso, Isorno, Mosogno, Onsernone and Vergeletto merged in the municipality of Onsernone.
- 2 April 2017 - Cresciano, Iragna, Lodrino and Osogna merged into a newly created municipality of Riviera.
- 2 April 2017 - Bellinzona, Camorino, Claro, Giubiasco, Gnosca, Gorduno, Gudo, Moleno, Monte Carasso, Pianezzo, Preonzo, Sant'Antonio and Sementina merged into the municipality of Bellinzona.
- 18 October 2020 - Brione (Verzasca), Corippo, Frasco, Sonogno and Vogorno merged into a newly created municipality of Verzasca.
- 18 April 2021 - Croglio, Monteggio, Ponte Tresa and Sessa merged into a newly created municipality of Tresa
- 10 April 2022 - Maroggia, Melano and Rovio merged into a newly created municipality of Val Mara
- 6 April 2025 - Astano, Bedigliora, Curio, Miglieglia and Novaggio merged into a newly created municipality of Lema
- 6 April 2025 - Prato Leventina and Quinto merged into the municipality of Quinto
- 6 April 2025 - Bodio and Giornico merged into the municipality of Giornico

=== Planned ===
- Bosco/Gurin, Campo (Vallemaggia), Cerentino, Cevio and Linescio to merge into the municipality of Cevio-Rovana
- Morcote and Vico Morcote to merge
- Aranno, Bioggio, Neggio and Vernate to merge
- Balerna, Breggia, Chiasso, Morbio Inferiore and Vacallo to merge
- Lavertezzo and Locarno to merge
