= Subdivisions of the canton of Ticino =

Subdivisions of the canton of Ticino, Switzerland, are the 100 comuni (and the 25 quarters of the municipality of Lugano) grouped into 38 circoli, which in turn form a part or the whole of one of the eight districts.

== Districts and circles ==
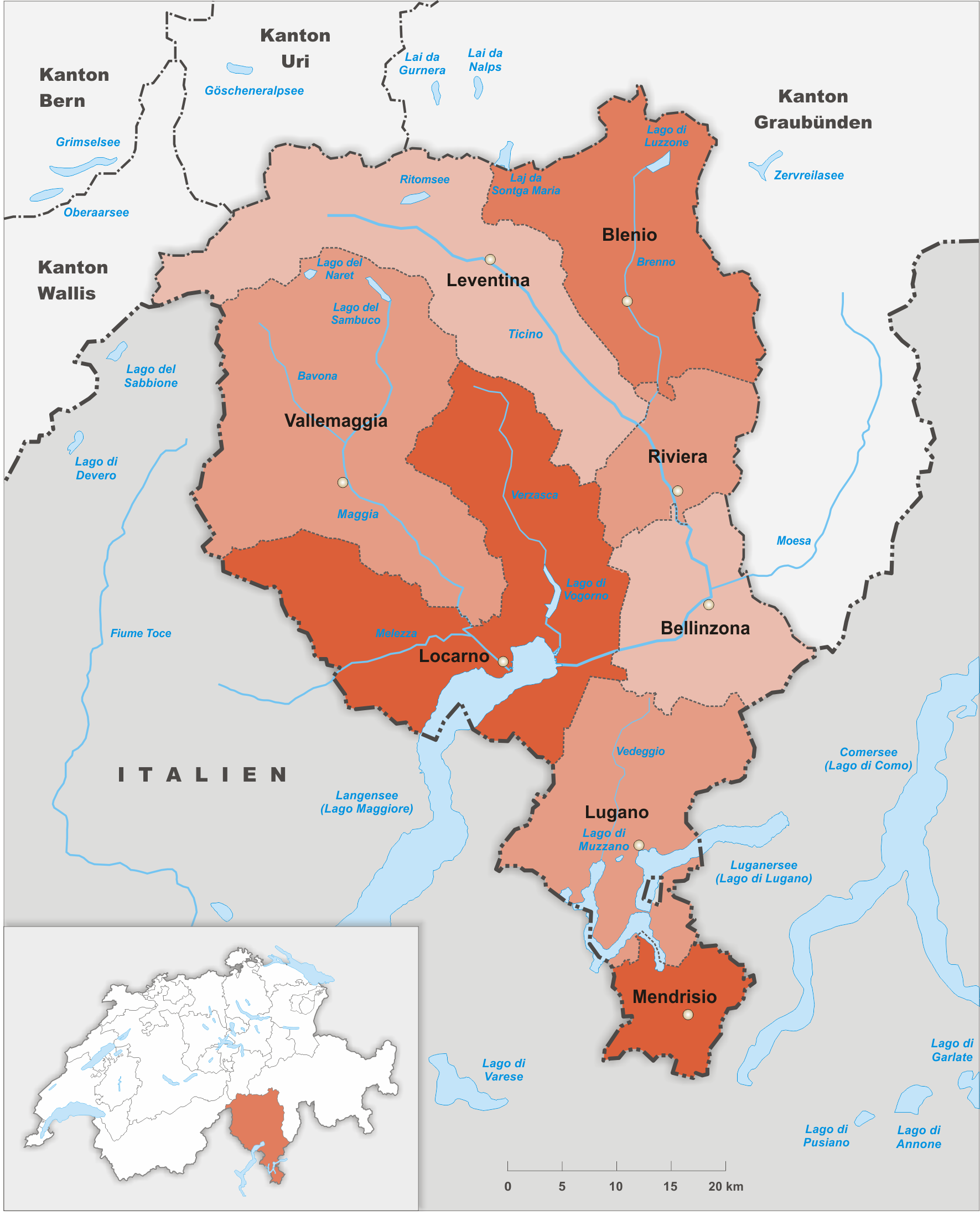
Districts of Ticino

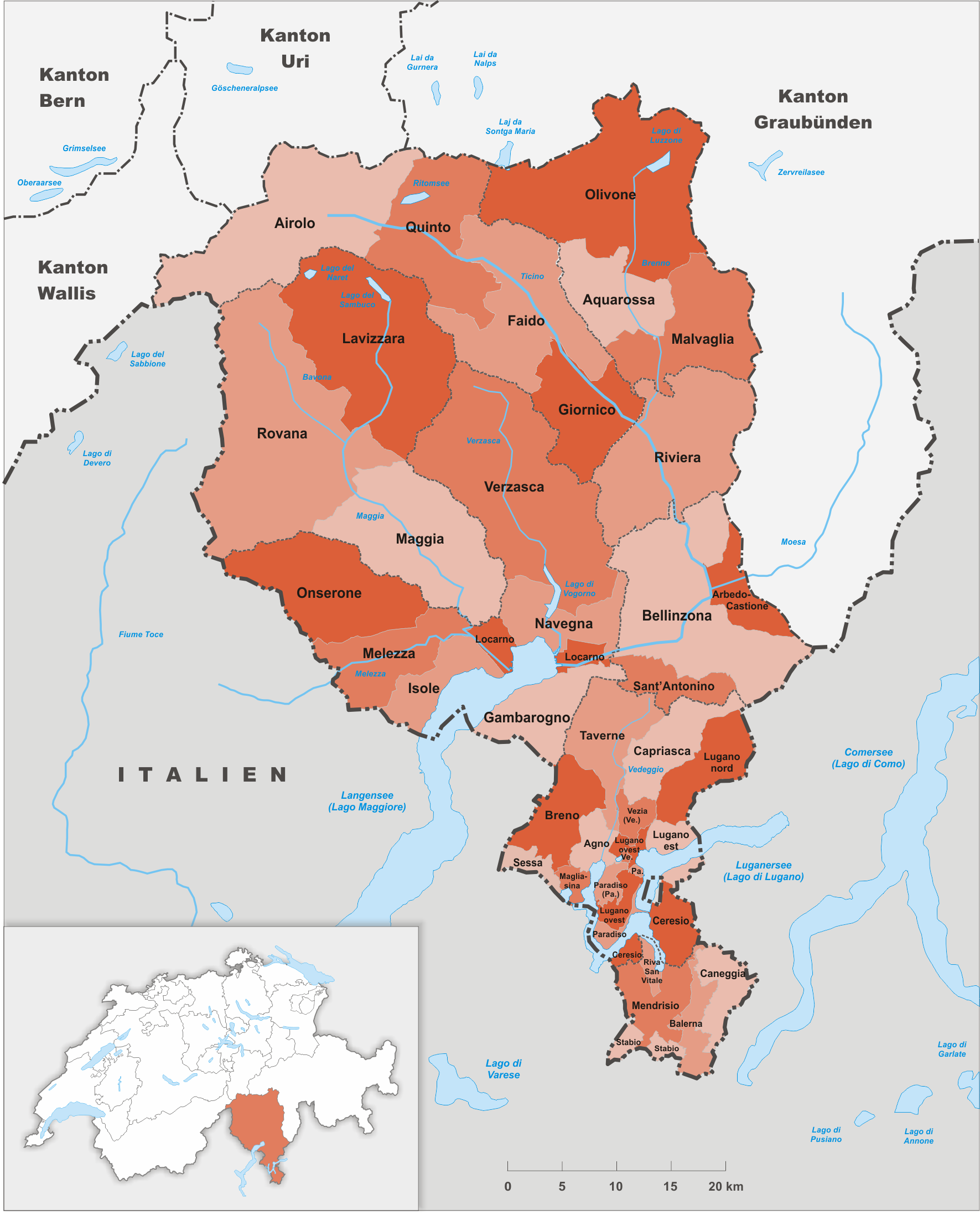
Circles of Ticino

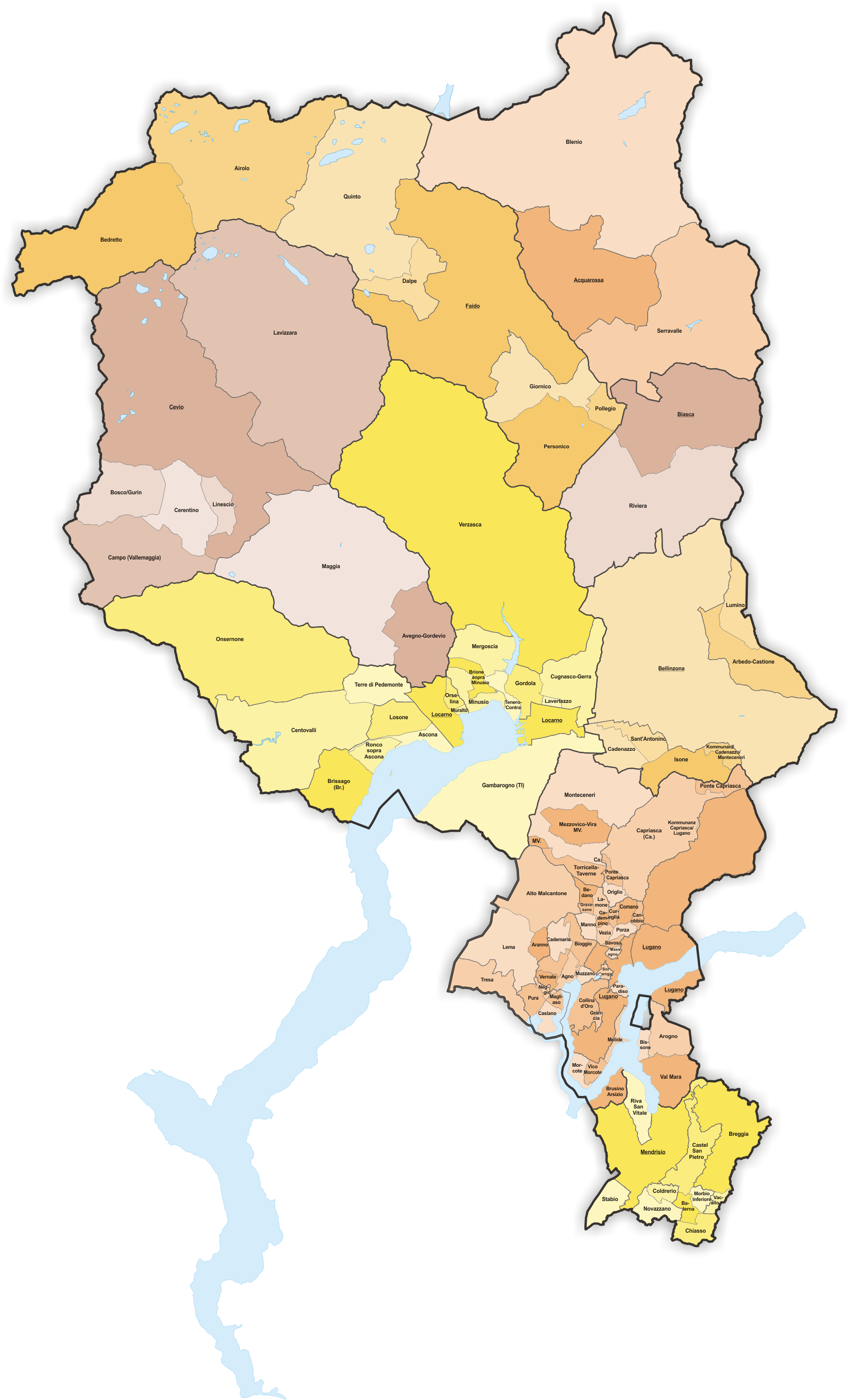
Municipalities of Ticino

The eight districts (distretti) are historic and are maintained by the constitution of the Republic and Canton of Ticino.

Leventina was a subject of the canton of Uri until 1798, the year the Helvetic Republic was founded, when it became part of the new canton of Bellinzona along with the Swiss condominiums of Bellinzona, Riviera and Blenio. The condominiums of Locarno, Lugano, Mendrisio and Vallemaggia became part of the new canton of Lugano in 1798. These two cantons formed into one canton — Ticino — in 1803 when it joined the (restored) Swiss Confederation as a member canton. The former condominiums and Leventina became the eight districts of the canton of Ticino.

The circles (circoli) in the present era, similar to the districts, serve only as an administrative territorial entity with limited public functions, most notably the local judiciary. Those shown below in italics are former or proposed circles. They are effectively sub-districts, though the smallest district (Riviera) has only one circle.

The following is the current establishment of municipalities, circles and districts.

Mendrisio District
Circle	Municipality
Circle of Mendrisio:	Mendrisio, Coldrerio.
Circle of Balerna:	Balerna, Castel San Pietro, Chiasso, Morbio Inferiore.
Circle of Caneggio:	Breggia, Vacallo.
Circle of Stabio:	Stabio, Novazzano.
Circle of Riva San Vitale:	Riva San Vitale.

Lugano District
Circle	Municipality
Circle of Lugano West:	Lugano (quarters to the right of the Cassarate riverbank).
Circle of Lugano East:	Lugano (quarters to the left of the Cassarate riverbank).
Circle of Lugano North:	Lugano (quarters of Sonvico, Villa Luganese, Davesco-Soragno, Val Colla, Cadro).
Circle of Ceresio:	Val Mara, Brusino Arsizio, Arogno, Bissone.
Circle of Carona:	(became the Circle of Paradiso in 2012 with the merger of Carona into the municipality of Lugano)
Circle of Paradiso:	Paradiso, Melide, Morcote, Vico Morcote, Grancia, Collina d’Oro.
Circle of Magliasina:	Caslano, Pura, Curio, Neggio, Magliaso.
Circle of Agno:	Agno, Bioggio, Muzzano, Cademario, Vernate.
Circle of Sessa:	Tresa, Astano, Bedigliora,
Circle of Sonvico:	(abolished in 2013 with the creation of the Circle of Lugano North)
Circle of Vezia:	Vezia, Cureglia, Cadempino, Lamone, Comano, Sorengo, Massagno, Savosa, Porza, Canobbio.
Circle of Breno:	Alto Malcantone, Novaggio, Miglieglia, Aranno.
Circle of Pregassona:	(abolished in 2004)
Circle of Capriasca:	Capriasca, Origlio, Ponte Capriasca.
Circle of Taverne:	Taverne-Torricella, Bedano, Gravesano, Manno, Monteceneri, Mezzovico-Vira.

Locarno District
Circle	Municipality
Circle of Locarno:	Locarno, Muralto, Orselina.
Circle of Isole:	Ascona, Brissago, Ronco sopra Ascona, Losone.
Circle of Onsernone:	Onsernone.
Circle of Gambarogno:	Gambarogno.
Circle of Melezza:	Centovalli, Terre di Pedemonte.
Circle of Verzasca:	Lavertezzo, Verzasca, Cugnasco-Gerra.
Circle of Navegna:	Tenero-Contra, Minusio, Mergoscia, Brione sopra Minusio, Gordola.

Vallemaggia District
Circle	Municipality
Circle of Rovana:	Cevio, Linescio, Cerentino, Campo (Vallemaggia), Bosco/Gurin.
Circle of Maggia:	Maggia, Avegno Gordevio.
Circle of Lavizzara:	Lavizzara.

Bellinzona District
Circle	Municipality
Circle of Arbedo-Castione:	Arbedo-Castione, Lumino
Circle of Bellinzona:	Bellinzona
Circle of Sant’Antonino:	Sant’Antonino, Cadenazzo, Isone
Circle of Ticino:	abolished in 2017 upon the merger of Monte Carasso, Gudo, Sementina, Gorduno, Gnosca, Preonzo and Moleno into Bellinzona)
Circle of Giubiasco:	abolished in 2017 upon the merger of Giubiasco, Pianezzo, Sant'Antonio and Camorino, into Bellinzona)

Riviera District
Circle	Municipality
Circle of Riviera:	Biasca, Riviera.

Blenio District
Circle	Municipality
Circle of Malvaglia:	Serravalle.
Circle of Acquarossa:	Acquarossa.
Circle of Olivone:	Blenio.

Leventina District
Circle	Municipality
Circle of Giornico:	Giornico, Bodio, Personico, Pollegio.
Circle of Faido:	Faido.
Circle of Quinto:	Quinto, Prato Leventina, Dalpe.
Circle of Airolo:	Airolo, Bedretto.

== Municipalities ==
The municipalities, or communes/communities (comuni) have since the late 1990s seen a steady series of mergers, bringing the total number down from 245 in 1995 to 108 in 2021, with further mergers planned. The constitution of the canton allows for the Grand Council of Ticino to promote and lead in deciding on mergers, and where it does so only advisory referendums are held in the municipalities affected.

== Quarters ==
The municipality and city of Lugano is subdivided into 25 quartieri (quarters) which are grouped into three (cantonal) circles.

Quarters 1–9 are the city's older quarters, which have been recently added to by successive enlargements of the municipality in 2004, 2008 and 2013; these enlargements involved previously independent municipalities becoming quarters of Lugano.

Quartier	No.	BFS-Code	Date joined Lugano	Former municipality	Circle	Quartieri of Lugano
Aldesago	1	5192001	1972	Brè-Aldesago	East	Quartieri of Lugano
Besso	2	5192002	–	–	West	Quartieri of Lugano
Brè	3	5192003	1972	Brè-Aldesago	East	Quartieri of Lugano
Caprino	4	5192004	1972	Castagnola-Cassarate	East	Quartieri of Lugano
Cassarate	5	5192005	1972	Castagnola-Cassarate	East	Quartieri of Lugano
Castagnola	6	5192006	1972	Castagnola-Cassarate	East	Quartieri of Lugano
Centro	7	5192007	–	–	West	Quartieri of Lugano
Loreto	8	5192008	–	–	West	Quartieri of Lugano
Molino Nuovo	9	5192009	–	–	West	Quartieri of Lugano
Breganzona	11	5192011	2004	Breganzona	West	Quartieri of Lugano
Cureggia	12	5192012	2004	Cureggia	East	Quartieri of Lugano
Davesco-Soragno	13	5192013	2004	Davesco-Soragno	North	Quartieri of Lugano
Gandria	14	5192014	2004	Gandria	East	Quartieri of Lugano
Pambio-Noranco	15	5192015	2004	Pambio-Noranco	East	Quartieri of Lugano
Pazzallo	16	5192016	2004	Pazzallo	West	Quartieri of Lugano
Pregassona	17	5192017	2004	Pregassona	East	Quartieri of Lugano
Viganello	18	5192018	2004	Viganello	East	Quartieri of Lugano
Barbengo	19	5192021	2008	Barbengo	West	Quartieri of Lugano
Carabbia	20	5192022	2008	Carabbia	West	Quartieri of Lugano
Villa Luganese	21	5192023	2008	Villa Luganese	North	Quartieri of Lugano
Cadro	22	5192024	2013	Cadro	North	Quartieri of Lugano
Carona	23	5192025	2013	Carona	West	Quartieri of Lugano
Sonvico	24	5192026	2013	Sonvico	North	Quartieri of Lugano
Val Colla	25	5192027	2013	Cimadera, Certara, Bogno, Valcolla	North	Quartieri of Lugano
