= Lema, Ticino =

Lema
- Municipality
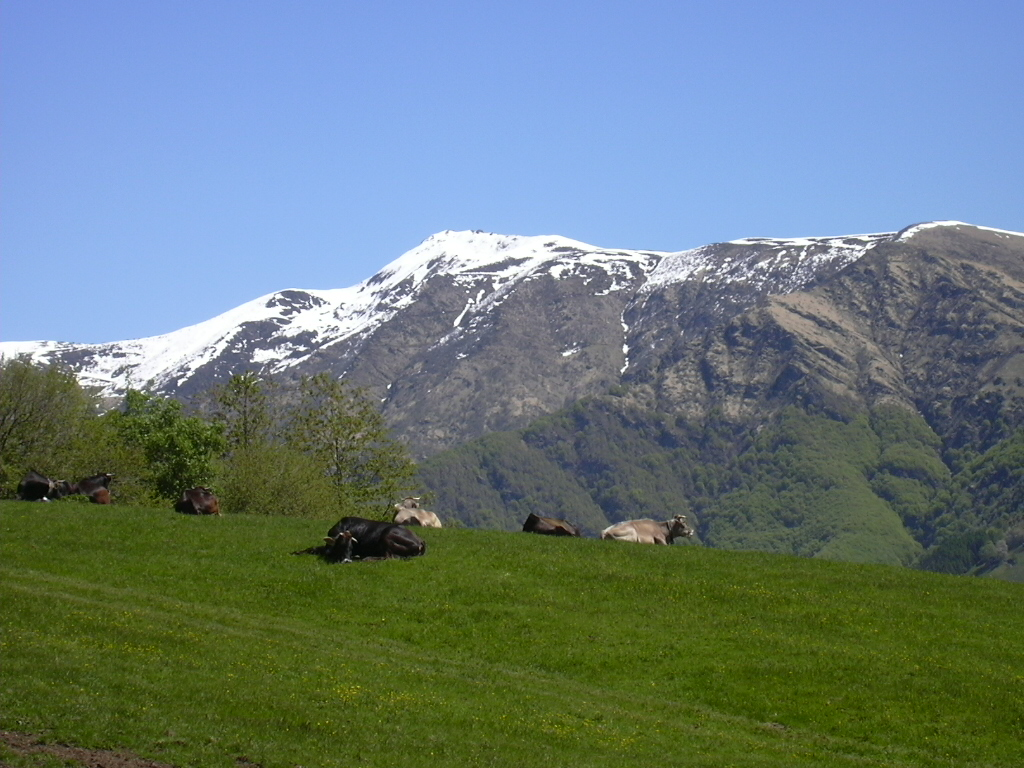
- Monte Lema

- Flag Coat of arms
- Location of Lema
- Location within Switzerland Location within Canton of Ticino
- Coordinates: 46°00′36″N 08°51′36″E
- Country: Switzerland
- Canton: Ticino
- District: Lugano

Government
  - Mayor: Sindaco

Area
  - Total: 18.56 km^{2} (7.17 sq mi)
- Elevation: 638 m (2,093 ft)

Population (31 December 2024)
  - Total: 2,662
  - Density: 143.4/km^{2} (371.5/sq mi)
- Time zone: UTC+01:00 (CET)
  - Summer (DST): UTC+02:00 (CEST)
- Postal codes: 6981; 6986; 6999
- SFOS number: 5395
- ISO 3166 code: CH-TI
- Localities: Astano, Bedigliora, Curio. Miglieglia, Novaggio
- Surrounded by: Alto Malcantone, Aranno, Bioggio, Curiglia con Monteviasco (IT-VA), Dumenza (IT-VA), Neggio, Pura, Tresa, Vernate
- Website: www.lema.ch

Lema is a municipality in the district of Lugano in the canton of Ticino in Switzerland. It was created on 6 April 2025 through the merger of Astano, Bedigliora, Curio, Miglieglia and Novaggio.
