= Pambio =

Village in Ticino, Switzerland

Coordinates: 45.988°N 8.934°E

Pambio is a village and former municipality in the District of Lugano, in the canton of Ticino in southern Switzerland.

== History ==
The village, formerly a municipality, in 1904 was merged with neighboring Noranco to constitute the new Municipality of Pambio-Noranco.

In 2004 the Municipality of Pambio-Noranco was incorporated into the larger, neighboring municipality and city of Lugano, and became a district−quarter of Lugano.
