= Noranco =

Village in Ticino, Switzerland

Coordinates: 45.984°N 8.9267°E

Noranco is a village and former municipality in the district of Lugano in the canton of Ticino, Switzerland.

The village, formerly a municipality of its own, was merged with neighboring Pambio in 1904 to form the new municipality of Pambio-Noranco. In 2004, the municipality was similarly incorporated into the larger, neighboring municipality of Lugano and now forms a quarter of that city.
