= Dumenza =

- Comune
- Comune di Dumenza
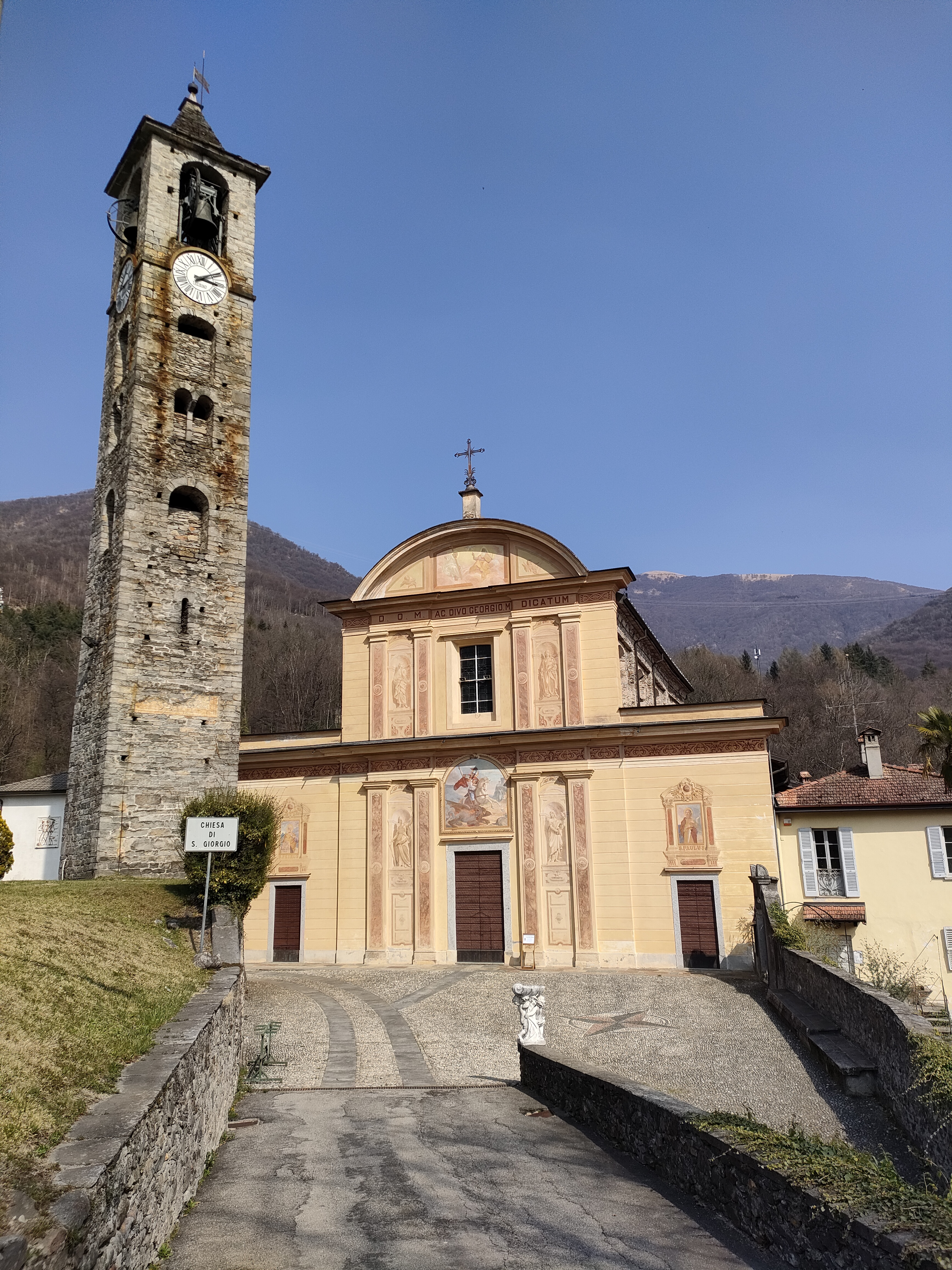

- Coat of arms

- Location within Italy Location within Lombardy
- Coordinates: 46°1′N 8°47′E
- Country: Italy
- Region: Lombardy
- Province: Varese (VA)
- Frazioni: Runo, Due Cossani, Stivigliano, Trezzino

Government
  - Mayor: Corrado Nazario Moro

Area
  - Total: 18.5 km^{2} (7.1 sq mi)
- Elevation: 411 m (1,348 ft)

Population (December 2004)
  - Total: 1,376
  - Density: 74.4/km^{2} (193/sq mi)
- Demonym: Dumentini
- Time zone: UTC+1 (CET)
  - Summer (DST): UTC+2 (CEST)
- Postal code: 21010
- Dialing code: 0332
- Website: Official website

Dumenza is a comune (municipality) in the Province of Varese in the Italian region of Lombardy, located about 70 kilometers (43 mi) northwest of Milan and about 25 kilometers (16 mi) north of Varese, on the border with Switzerland.

The municipality of Dumenza contains the frazioni (subdivisions, mainly villages and hamlets) Runo (birthplace of painter Bernardino Luini), Due Cossani, Stivigliano, and Trezzino.

Dumenza borders the following municipalities: Agra, Astano (Switzerland), Curiglia con Monteviasco, Luino, Maccagno con Pino e Veddasca, Miglieglia (Switzerland), Monteggio (Switzerland), Novaggio (Switzerland), Sessa (Switzerland).

== Notable people ==
- Vincenzo Peruggia
- Bartolomeo Scappi
