= Cureggia =

Coordinates: 46°1′13″N 8°59′3″E

- Quarter
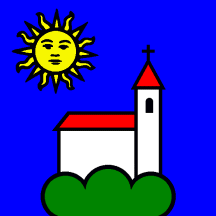
- Flag Coat of arms

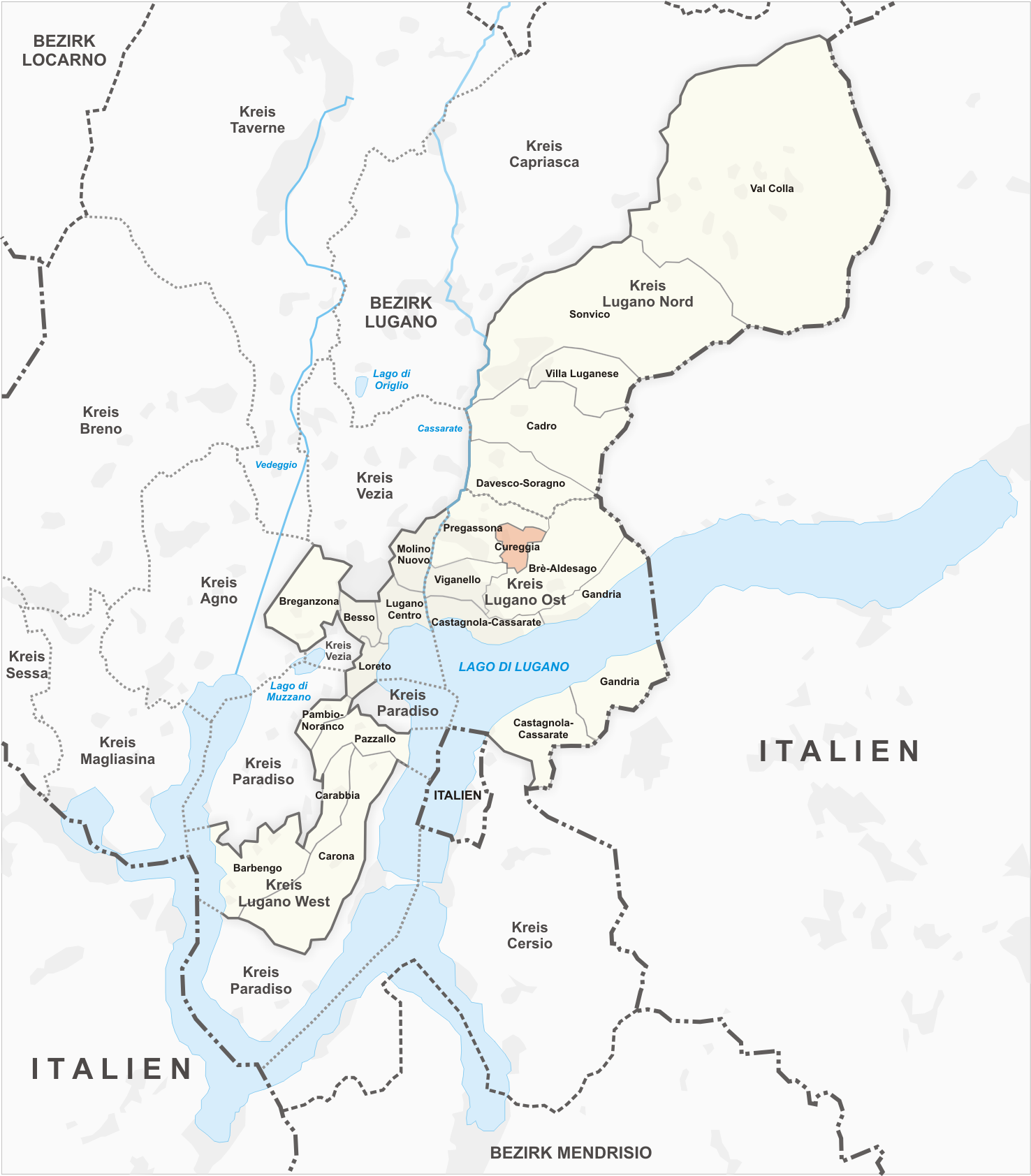
- Country: Switzerland
- Canton: Ticino
- District: Lugano
- City: Lugano

Area
  - Total: 0.69 km^{2} (0.27 sq mi)

Population (2012-12-31)
  - Total: 177
  - Density: 260/km^{2} (660/sq mi)

Cureggia is a quarter of the city of Lugano, Switzerland. Cureggia was formerly a municipality of its own, having been incorporated into Lugano in 2004. It was first recorded in 1329 as Curezia.

Cureggia had 62 inhabitants in 1799, which decreased to 53 in 1850, 47 in 1900 and 24 in 1950. It then increased again, to 112 in 2000.
