= Bottino =

Bottino is a surname. Notable people with the surname include:

- Cecilia Bottino (born 1968), Uruguayan lawyer and politician
- Filippo Bottino (1888–1969), Italian heavyweight weightlifter
- Louis Bottino (1907–1979), American educator and politician
- Nestor Bottino (born 1955), Argentine-born American architect
