= Pambio Noranco =

Coordinates: 45°59′20″N 8°56′2″E

- Quarter
- Flag Coat of arms

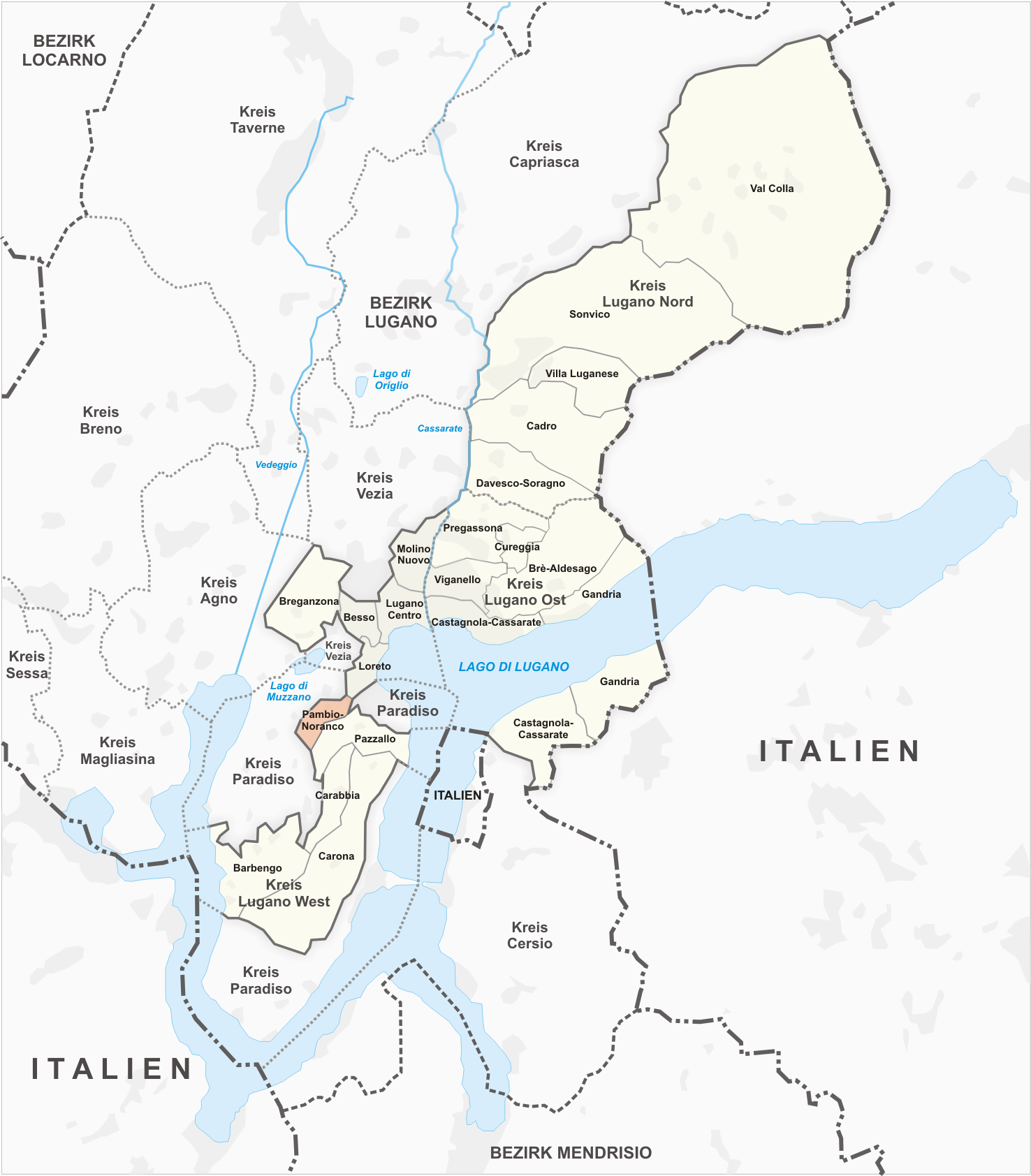
- Country: Switzerland
- Canton: Ticino
- District: Lugano
- City: Lugano

Area
  - Total: 0.6 km^{2} (0.23 sq mi)

Population (2012-12-31)
  - Total: 701
  - Density: 1,200/km^{2} (3,000/sq mi)

Pambio Noranco is a quarter of the city of Lugano, Switzerland.

Pambio Noranco was formerly a municipality of its own, having been incorporated into Lugano in 2004.

== Villages ==
- Noranco
- Pambio
