= Astano =

- Former municipality
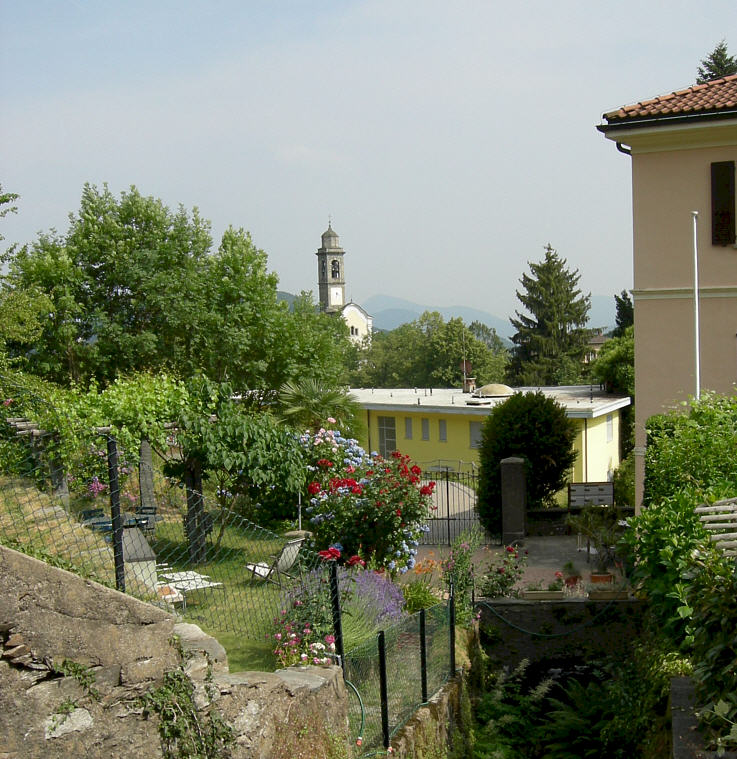
- Astano village

- Flag Coat of arms
- Location of Astano
- Location within Switzerland Location within Canton of Ticino
- Coordinates: 46°1′N 8°49′E
- Country: Switzerland
- Canton: Ticino
- District: Lugano

Government
  - Mayor: Sindaco; Brigitte Cella

Area
  - Total: 3.78 km^{2} (1.46 sq mi)
- Elevation: 631 m (2,070 ft)

Population (December 2016)
  - Total: 305
  - Density: 80.7/km^{2} (209/sq mi)
- Time zone: UTC+01:00 (CET)
  - Summer (DST): UTC+02:00 (CEST)
- Postal code: 6999
- SFOS number: 5146
- ISO 3166 code: CH-TI
- Surrounded by: Curio, Dumenza (IT-VA), Novaggio, Sessa, Bedigliora
- Website: www.astano.ch

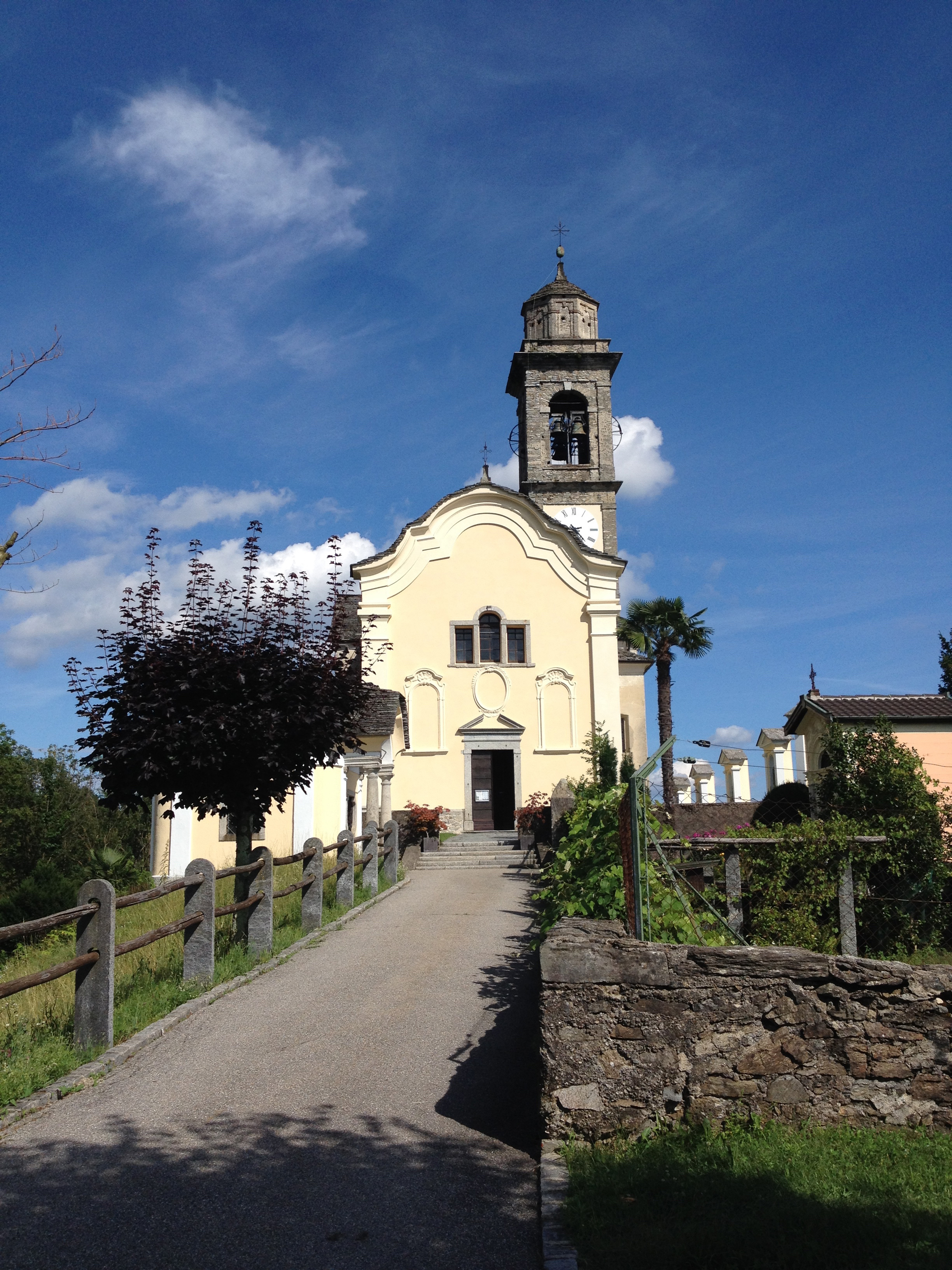
Church of S. Pietro

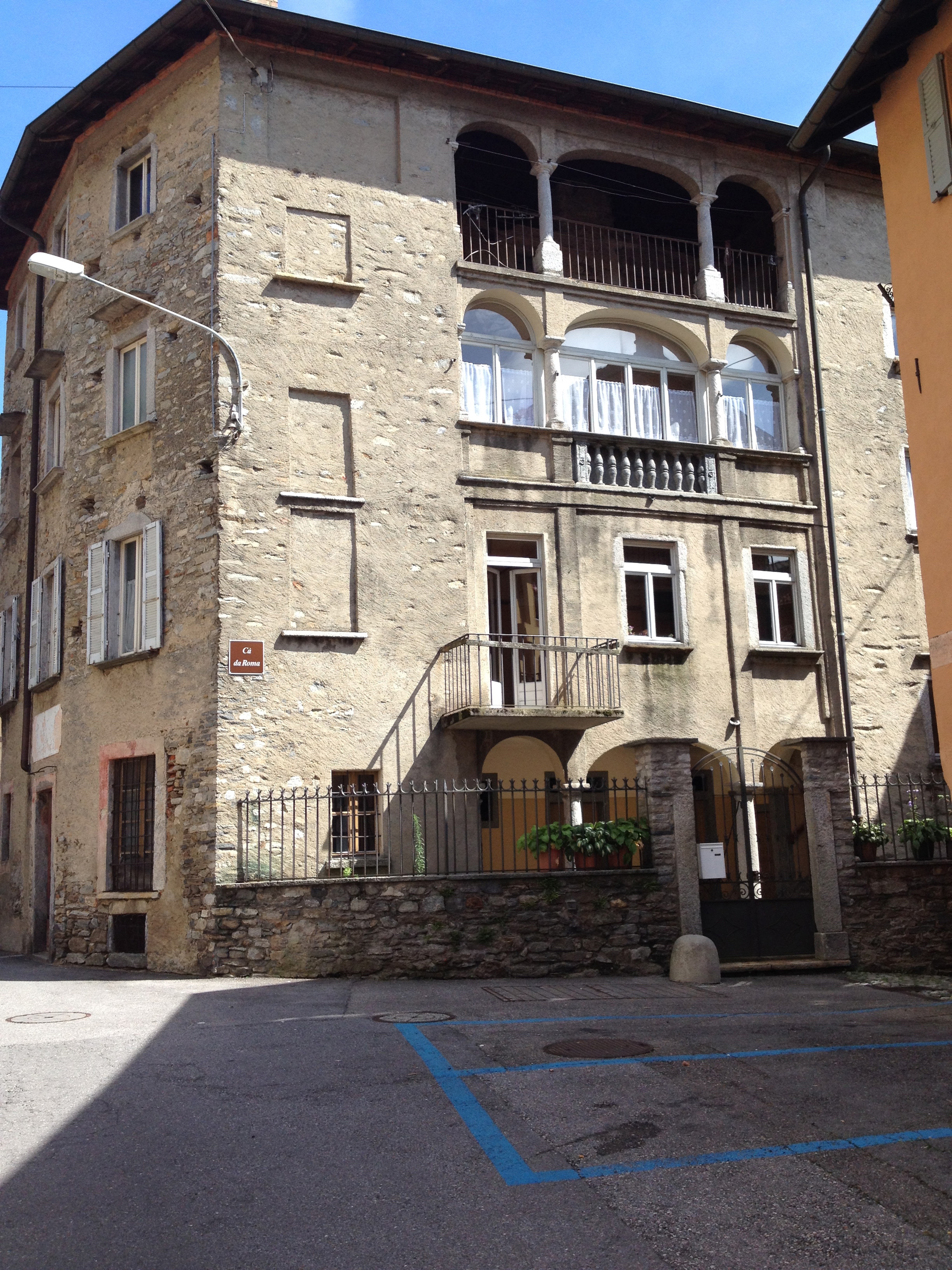
Ca' da Roma

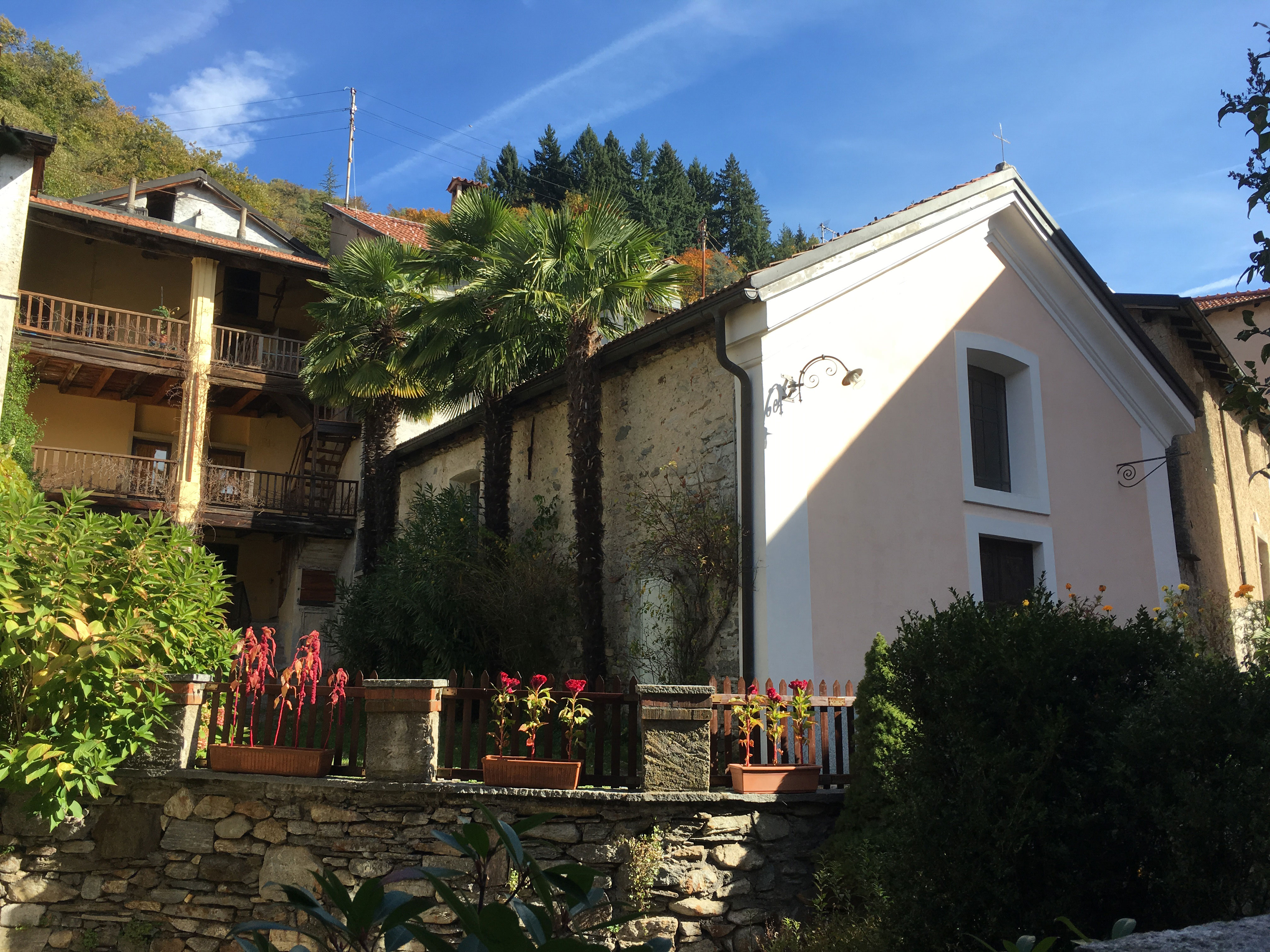
Chapel and former Humiliati minster Sant’Antonio Abate

Astano is a former municipality in the district of Lugano in the canton of Ticino in Switzerland. On 6 April 2025, the former municipalities of Astano, Bedigliora, Curio, Miglieglia and Novaggio merged to form the new municipality of Lema.

== History ==
Astano is first mentioned in 1272 as Astanum. The old village center has some architecturally notable buildings, such as the Ca' da Roma. In the Middle Ages the monastery of S. Pietro in Ciel d'Oro owned land in Astano. In the 13th century, there was a Humiliati monastery in the village. When it was abandoned in the mid-15th century, the property passed to the Humiliati monastery of S. Caterina in Lugano. In 1612 it became a separate parish. The parish church of S. Pietro was built in 1654 on the ruins of an old chapel.

The village produced a number of architects who emigrated to other countries for work, including Domenico Trezzini and members of the De Marchi and Donati families. Traditional agriculture included the use of the Alpe di Monte (alpine pasture) on Monte Rogoria. The gold-bearing strata of the Monte Sceree was mined, starting in the early 19th century and running until after World War II, when the mine stopped producing. Today is a spa town with good tourist infrastructure and many commuters to the Lugano valley.

== Geography ==
Astano has an area, as of 1997, of 3.78 square kilometers (1.46 sq mi). Of this area, 0.51 km^{2} (0.20 sq mi) or 13.5% is used for agricultural purposes, while 3.21 km^{2} (1.24 sq mi) or 84.9% is forested. Of the rest of the land, 0.34 km^{2} (0.13 sq mi) or 9.0% is settled (buildings or roads) and 0.02 km^{2} (4.9 acres) or 0.5% is unproductive land.

Of the built up area, housing and buildings made up 6.6% and transportation infrastructure made up 1.1%. while parks, green belts and sports fields made up 1.3%. Out of the forested land, 81.5% of the total land area is heavily forested and 3.4% is covered with orchards or small clusters of trees. Of the agricultural land, 6.3% is used for growing crops and 6.6% is used for alpine pastures.

The municipality is located in the Lugano district, in the middle Malcantone Valley.

== Coat of arms ==
The blazon of the municipal coat of arms is Gules a goat rampant between two bezants in bend.

== Demographics ==
Astano has a population (as of December 2020) of 294. As of 2008, 10.6% of the population are resident foreign nationals. Over the last 10 years (1997–2007) the population has changed at a rate of 15.2%.

Most of the population (as of 2000) speaks Italian (67.2%), with German being second most common (24.1%) and French being third (3.1%). Of the Swiss national languages (as of 2000), 70 speak German, 9 people speak French, 195 people speak Italian, and 1 person speaks Romansh. The remainder (15 people) speak another language.

As of 2008, the gender distribution of the population was 51.1% male and 48.9% female. The population was made up of 135 Swiss men (43.4% of the population), and 24 (7.7%) non-Swiss men. There were 137 Swiss women (44.1%), and 15 (4.8%) non-Swiss women.

In 2008 there were 3 live births to Swiss citizens and were 4 deaths of Swiss citizens. Ignoring immigration and emigration, the population of Swiss citizens decreased by 1 while the foreign population remained the same. At the same time, there was 1 non-Swiss man and 1 non-Swiss woman who emigrated from Switzerland to another country. The total Swiss population change in 2008 (from all sources, including moves across municipal borders) was an increase of 2 and the non-Swiss population change was a decrease of 1 people. This represents a population growth rate of 0.3%.

The age distribution, as of 2009, in Astano is; 25 children or 8.0% of the population are between 0 and 9 years old and 21 teenagers or 6.8% are between 10 and 19. Of the adult population, 26 people or 8.4% of the population are between 20 and 29 years old. 32 people or 10.3% are between 30 and 39, 46 people or 14.8% are between 40 and 49, and 57 people or 18.3% are between 50 and 59. The senior population distribution is 32 people or 10.3% of the population are between 60 and 69 years old, 42 people or 13.5% are between 70 and 79, there are 30 people or 9.6% who are over 80.

As of 2000, there were 137 private households in the municipality, and an average of 2.1 persons per household. In 2000 there were 177 single family homes (or 81.6% of the total) out of a total of 217 inhabited buildings. There were 17 two family buildings (7.8%) and 14 multi-family buildings (6.5%). There were also 9 buildings in the municipality that were multipurpose buildings (used for both housing and commercial or another purpose).

The vacancy rate for the municipality, in 2008, was 0.99%. In 2000 there were 292 apartments in the municipality. The most common apartment size was the 3 room apartment of which there were 85. There were 10 single room apartments and 85 apartments with five or more rooms. Of these apartments, a total of 137 apartments (46.9% of the total) were permanently occupied, while 150 apartments (51.4%) were seasonally occupied and 5 apartments (1.7%) were empty. As of 2007, the construction rate of new housing units was 0 new units per 1000 residents.

The historical population is given in the following table:

year	population
1599	269
1801	356
1850	395
1900	384
1950	258
1980	209
2000	290

== Sights ==
The entire village of Astano is designated as part of the Inventory of Swiss Heritage Sites.

== Politics ==
In the 2007 federal election the most popular party was the SVP which received 24.31% of the vote. The next three most popular parties were the SP (20.86%), the Ticino League (16.57%) and the FDP (15.88%). In the federal election, a total of 97 votes were cast, and the voter turnout was 37.6%.

In the 2007 Gran Consiglio election, there were a total of 257 registered voters in Astano, of which 130 or 50.6% voted. The most popular party was the LEGA which received 26 or 20.0% of the vote. The next three most popular parties were; the PS (with 25 or 19.2%), the SSI (with 20 or 15.4%) and the PLRT (with 16 or 12.3%).

In the 2007 Consiglio di Stato election, The most popular party was the PS which received 31 or 23.8% of the vote. The next three most popular parties were; the LEGA (with 30 or 23.1%), the SSI (with 20 or 15.4%) and the PPD (with 15 or 11.5%).

== Economy ==
As of 2007, Astano had an unemployment rate of 4.67%. As of 2005, there were 2 people employed in the primary economic sector and about 1 business involved in this sector. 2 people were employed in the secondary sector and there was 1 business in this sector. 25 people were employed in the tertiary sector, with 9 businesses in this sector. There were 114 residents of the municipality who were employed in some capacity, of which females made up 31.6% of the workforce.

In 2000, there were 4 workers who commuted into the municipality and 75 workers who commuted away. The municipality is a net exporter of workers, with about 18.8 workers leaving the municipality for every one entering. Of the working population, 4.4% used public transportation to get to work, and 62.3% used a private car.

As of 2009, there was one hotel in Astano.

== Religion ==
From the 2000 census, 182 or 62.8% were Roman Catholic, while 53 or 18.3% belonged to the Swiss Reformed Church. There are 49 individuals (or about 16.90% of the population) who belong to another church (not listed on the census), and 6 individuals (or about 2.07% of the population) did not answer the question.

== Education ==
The entire Swiss population is generally well educated. In Astano about 69.7% of the population (between age 25 and 64) have completed either non-mandatory upper secondary education or additional higher education (either university or a Fachhochschule).

In Astano there were a total of 35 students (as of 2009). The Ticino education system provides up to three years of non-mandatory kindergarten and in Astano there were 5 children in kindergarten. The primary school program lasts for five years. In the municipality, 14 students attended the standard primary schools. In the lower secondary school system, students either attend a two-year middle school followed by a two-year pre-apprenticeship or they attend a four-year program to prepare for higher education. There were 8 students in the two-year middle school, while 4 students were in the four-year advanced program.

The upper secondary school includes several options, but at the end of the upper secondary program, a student will be prepared to enter a trade or to continue on to a university or college. In Ticino, vocational students may either attend school while working on their internship or apprenticeship (which takes three or four years) or may attend school followed by an internship or apprenticeship (which takes one year as a full-time student or one and a half to two years as a part-time student). There were 2 vocational students who were attending school full-time and 2 who attend part-time.

As of 2000, there were 40 students from Astano who attended schools outside the municipality.
