= Bedigliora =

- Former municipality
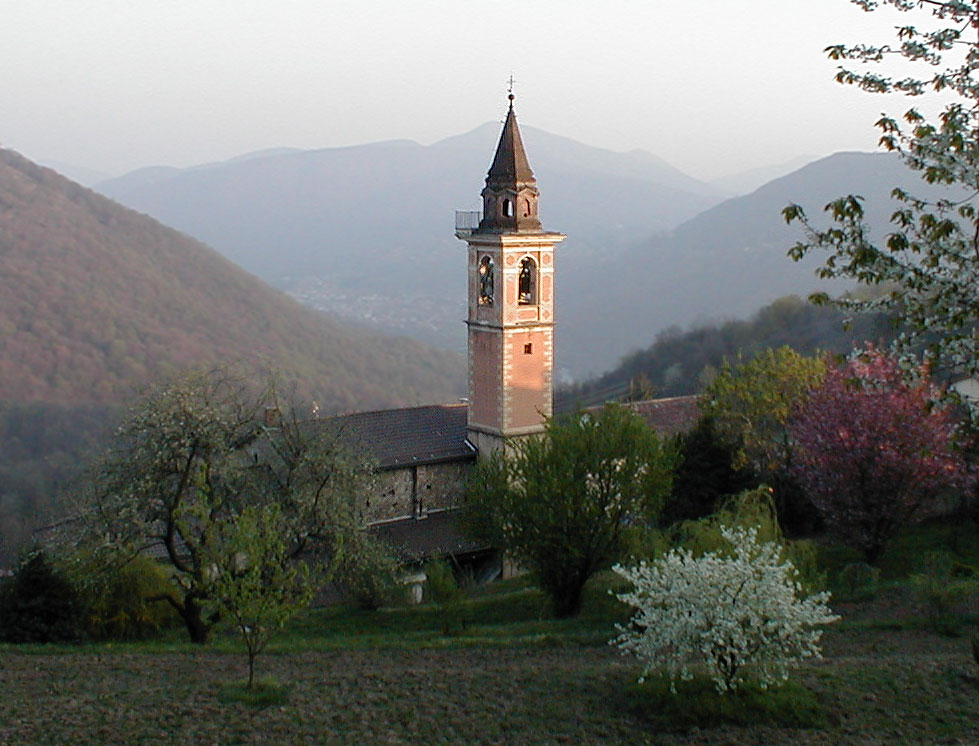
- Bedigliora village church

- Flag Coat of arms
- Location of Bedigliora
- Location within Switzerland Location within Canton of Ticino
- Coordinates: 46°0′N 8°51′E
- Country: Switzerland
- Canton: Ticino
- District: Lugano

Government
  - Mayor: Sindaco

Area
  - Total: 2.5 km^{2} (0.97 sq mi)
- Elevation: 617 m (2,024 ft)

Population (December 2004)
  - Total: 603
  - Density: 240/km^{2} (620/sq mi)
- Time zone: UTC+01:00 (CET)
  - Summer (DST): UTC+02:00 (CEST)
- Postal code: 6981
- SFOS number: 5149
- ISO 3166 code: CH-TI
- Surrounded by: Croglio, Curio, Novaggio, Pura, Sessa
- Website: www.bedigliora.ch

Bedigliora is a former municipality in the district of Lugano in the canton of Ticino in Switzerland. On 6 April 2025, the former municipalities of Astano, Bedigliora, Curio, Miglieglia and Novaggio merged to form the new municipality of Lema.

== History ==
Bedigliora is first mentioned in 1335 as Bedaliola. The settlement of Banco is first mentioned as Bango in 1421.

Traces of prehistoric settlements in the area include a Neolithic era ax, tombs from the Iron Age, a stele with northern Etruscan inscriptions and a domed grave. During the Middle Ages, Bedigliora and Banco along with Curio and Novaggio formed a Kastlanei.

The provost's Church of St. Roch was consecrated in 1644, however it was built over an older chapel. The church of San Salvatore in Banco goes back to the Middle Ages and was originally the religious and secular center of the Kastlanei. In 1612, Bedigliora became the seat of the parish church.

The temporary emigration of earlier centuries has been replaced by a largely commuting population. In 1990, about two-thirds of the population commuted, mostly to Lugano.

Bedigliora has a primary and a secondary school.

== Geography ==
Bedigliora has an area, as of 1997, of 2.48 square kilometers (0.96 sq mi). Of this area, 0.44 km^{2} (0.17 sq mi) or 17.7% is used for agricultural purposes, while 1.91 km^{2} (0.74 sq mi) or 77.0% is forested. Of the rest of the land, 0.33 km^{2} (0.13 sq mi) or 13.3% is settled (buildings or roads).

Of the built up area, housing and buildings made up 8.5% and transportation infrastructure made up 3.6%. Out of the forested land, 69.8% of the total land area is heavily forested and 7.3% is covered with orchards or small clusters of trees. Of the agricultural land, 8.5% is used for growing crops and 8.5% is used for alpine pastures.

The municipality is located in the Lugano district, on the southern slope of Monte Bedeglia in the mid-Malcantone valley. It consists of the village of Bedigliora and the hamlets of Nerocco, Beride and Banco.

== Coat of arms ==
The blazon of the municipal coat of arms is Per pale gules a nail argent and or an owl sable. Both the nail (Italian: chiodo) and the owl (Italian: alloco) refer to the nicknames of the settlements of Bedigliora and Banco, respectively."

== Demographics ==
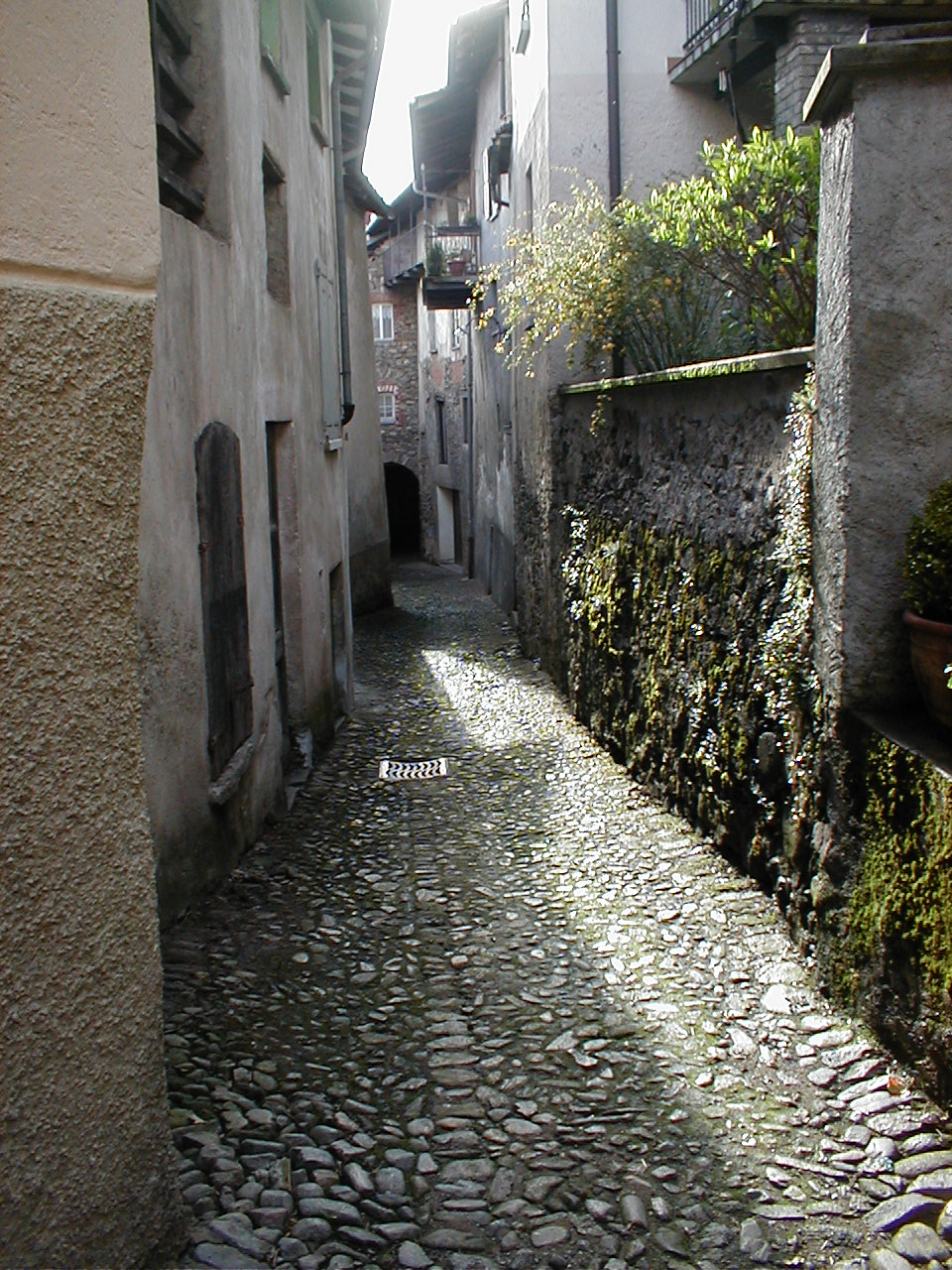
An alley in Bedigliora

Bedigliora has a population (as of December 2020) of 604. As of 2008, 9.1% of the population are resident foreign nationals. Over the last 10 years (1997–2007) the population has changed at a rate of 17.5%.

Most of the population (as of 2000) speaks Italian (85.2%), with German being second most common (10.2%) and French being third (1.9%). Of the Swiss national languages (as of 2000), 55 speak German, 10 people speak French, 460 people speak Italian, and 1 person speaks Romansh. The remainder (14 people) speak another language.

As of 2008, the gender distribution of the population was 47.6% male and 52.4% female. The population was made up of 278 Swiss men (42.6% of the population), and 33 (5.1%) non-Swiss men. There were 318 Swiss women (48.7%), and 24 (3.7%) non-Swiss women.

In 2008 there were 2 live births to Swiss citizens, 3 deaths of Swiss citizens and 1 non-Swiss citizen death. Ignoring immigration and emigration, the population of Swiss citizens decreased by 1 while the foreign population decreased by 1. There was 1 non-Swiss man who emigrated from Switzerland to another country. The total Swiss population change in 2008 (from all sources, including moves across municipal borders) was an increase of 5 and the non-Swiss population change was a decrease of 3 people. This represents a population growth rate of 0.3%.

The age distribution, as of 2009, in Bedigliora is; 62 children or 9.5% of the population are between 0 and 9 years old and 90 teenagers or 13.8% are between 10 and 19. Of the adult population, 61 people or 9.3% of the population are between 20 and 29 years old. 75 people or 11.5% are between 30 and 39, 139 people or 21.3% are between 40 and 49, and 93 people or 14.2% are between 50 and 59. The senior population distribution is 60 people or 9.2% of the population are between 60 and 69 years old, 40 people or 6.1% are between 70 and 79, there are 33 people or 5.1% who are over 80.

As of 2000, there were 233 private households in the municipality, and an average of 2.3 persons per household. In 2000 there were 201 single family homes (or 74.7% of the total) out of a total of 269 inhabited buildings. There were 41 two family buildings (15.2%) and 17 multi-family buildings (6.3%). There were also 10 buildings in the municipality that were multipurpose buildings (used for both housing and commercial or another purpose).

The vacancy rate for the municipality, in 2008, was 0%. In 2000 there were 347 apartments in the municipality. The most common apartment size was the 5 room apartment of which there were 125. There were 18 single room apartments and 125 apartments with five or more rooms. Of these apartments, a total of 232 apartments (66.9% of the total) were permanently occupied, while 110 apartments (31.7%) were seasonally occupied and 5 apartments (1.4%) were empty. As of 2007, the construction rate of new housing units was 8 new units per 1000 residents.

The historical population is given in the following table:

year	population
1591	420
1696	517
1801	500
1850	499
1900	495
1950	344
1960	314
1990	399
2000	540

== Sights ==
The entire village of Bedigliora is designated as part of the Inventory of Swiss Heritage Sites.

== Politics ==
In the 2007 federal election the most popular party was the CVP which received 24.15% of the vote. The next three most popular parties were the SP (23.75%), the FDP (21.5%) and the Ticino League (14.9%). In the federal election, a total of 170 votes were cast, and the voter turnout was 36.3%.

In the 2007 Gran Consiglio election, there were a total of 470 registered voters in Bedigliora, of which 249 or 53.0% voted. 2 blank ballots were cast, leaving 247 valid ballots in the election. The most popular parties were the PLRT and PS both of which received 56 or 22.7% of the vote. The next two most popular parties were; the PPD+GenGiova (with 45 or 18.2%) and the LEGA (with 31 or 12.6%).

In the 2007 Consiglio di Stato election, 1 blank ballot was cast, leaving 249 valid ballots in the election. The most popular party was the PS which received 63 or 25.3% of the vote. The next three most popular parties were; the LEGA (with 54 or 21.7%), the PLRT (with 49 or 19.7%) and the PPD (with 41 or 16.5%).

== Economy ==
As of 2007, Bedigliora had an unemployment rate of 3.31%. As of 2005, there were 8 people employed in the primary economic sector and about 5 businesses involved in this sector. 10 people were employed in the secondary sector and there were 5 businesses in this sector. 86 people were employed in the tertiary sector, with 16 businesses in this sector. There were 242 residents of the municipality who were employed in some capacity, of which females made up 45.9% of the workforce.

In 2000, there were 55 workers who commuted into the municipality and 175 workers who commuted away. The municipality is a net exporter of workers, with about 3.2 workers leaving the municipality for every one entering. About 7.3% of the workforce coming into Bedigliora are coming from outside Switzerland. Of the working population, 6.6% used public transportation to get to work, and 63.6% used a private car.

== Religion ==
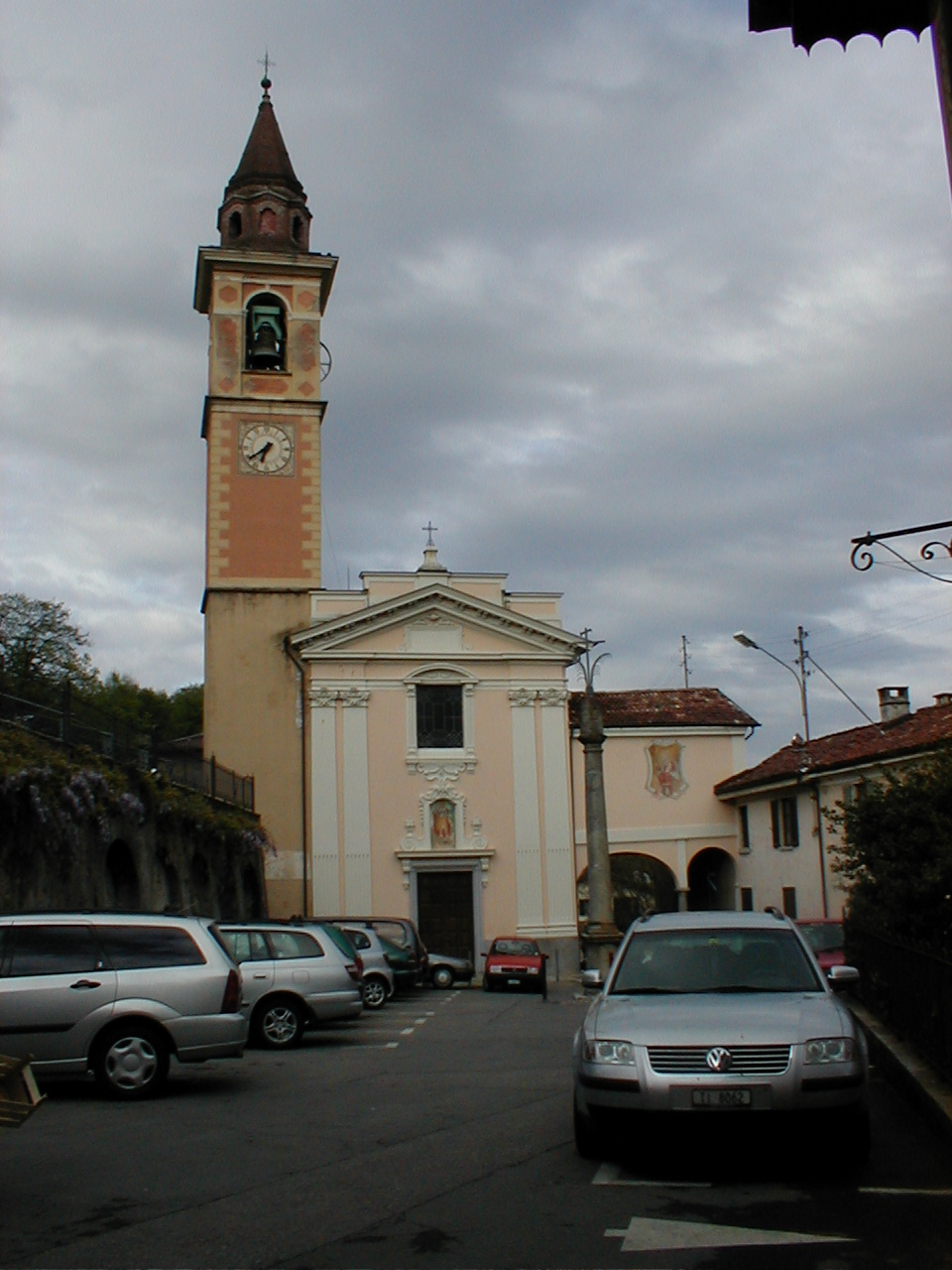
Bedigliora village church

From the 2000 census, 411 or 76.1% were Roman Catholic, while 34 or 6.3% belonged to the Swiss Reformed Church. There are 66 individuals (or about 12.22% of the population) who belong to another church (not listed on the census), and 29 individuals (or about 5.37% of the population) did not answer the question.

== Education ==
In Bedigliora about 81% of the population (between age 25-64) have completed either non-mandatory upper secondary education or additional higher education (either university or a Fachhochschule).

In Bedigliora there were a total of 136 students (as of 2009). The Ticino education system provides up to three years of non-mandatory kindergarten and in Bedigliora there were 22 children in kindergarten. The primary school program lasts for five years and includes both a standard school and a special school. In the municipality, 35 students attended the standard primary schools and 2 students attended the special school. In the lower secondary school system, students either attend a two-year middle school followed by a two-year pre-apprenticeship or they attend a four-year program to prepare for higher education. There were 42 students in the two-year middle school and 1 in their pre-apprenticeship, while 11 students were in the four-year advanced program.

The upper secondary school includes several options, but at the end of the upper secondary program, a student will be prepared to enter a trade or to continue on to a university or college. In Ticino, vocational students may either attend school while working on their internship or apprenticeship (which takes three or four years) or may attend school followed by an internship or apprenticeship (which takes one year as a full-time student or one and a half to two years as a part-time student). There were 7 vocational students who were attending school full-time and 15 who attend part-time.

The professional program lasts three years and prepares a student for a job in engineering, nursing, computer science, business, tourism and similar fields. There was 1 student in the professional program.

As of 2000, there were 310 students in Bedigliora who came from another municipality, while 21 residents attended schools outside the municipality.
