= Pura, Switzerland =

Pura
- Municipality
- Flag Coat of arms
- Location of Pura
- Location within Switzerland Location within Canton of Ticino
- Coordinates: 45°59′N 8°52′E
- Country: Switzerland
- Canton: Ticino
- District: Lugano

Government
  - Mayor: Sindaco

Area
  - Total: 3.04 km^{2} (1.17 sq mi)
- Elevation: 387 m (1,270 ft)

Population (December 2004)
  - Total: 1,176
  - Density: 387/km^{2} (1,000/sq mi)
- Time zone: UTC+01:00 (CET)
  - Summer (DST): UTC+02:00 (CEST)
- Postal code: 6984
- SFOS number: 5216
- ISO 3166 code: CH-TI
- Surrounded by: Bedigliora, Caslano, Croglio, Curio, Magliaso, Neggio, Ponte Tresa
- Website: www.pura.ch

Pura is a municipality in the district of Lugano in the canton of Ticino in Switzerland.

== History ==
Aerial view (1950)

Pura is first mentioned around 751–760, though this is found in a 17th-century copy of the original.

In the Middle Ages several institutions such as the monastery of San Pietro in Ciel d'Oro in Pavia, Como Cathedral, Disentis Abbey and the monastery of Agno possessed property or land in Pura.

The village was part of the Agno parish until 1603 when it became a separate parish. The parish church of San Martino was first mentioned in 1352. It was rebuilt in 1580 and expanded between 1642 and 1658.

The village economy was based mainly on agriculture, livestock and the dairy industry. The dairy cooperative opened in 1890. Due to limited farming land many of the residents emigrated in the 19th century. The majority of them went to Italy to work as brickmakers. In the 1960s, a strong construction boom began. By 2000, approximately three quarters of the working population are commuters, especially to Lugano.

== Geography ==
Pura has an area, as of 1997, of 3.04 square kilometers (1.17 sq mi). Of this area, 0.67 km^{2} (0.26 sq mi) or 22.0% is used for agricultural purposes, while 2.28 km^{2} (0.88 sq mi) or 75.0% is forested. Of the rest of the land, 0.53 km^{2} (0.20 sq mi) or 17.4% is settled (buildings or roads), 0.02 km^{2} (4.9 acres) or 0.7% is either rivers or lakes and 0.02 km^{2} (4.9 acres) or 0.7% is unproductive land.

Of the built up area, housing and buildings made up 14.1% and transportation infrastructure made up 3.0%. Out of the forested land, 69.1% of the total land area is heavily forested and 5.9% is covered with orchards or small clusters of trees. Of the agricultural land, 4.9% is used for growing crops, while 3.0% is used for orchards or vine crops and 14.1% is used for alpine pastures. Of the water in the municipality, 0.3% is in lakes and 0.3% is in rivers and streams.

The municipality is located in the Lugano district, on a terrace above the Magliasina, in the mid-Malcantone valley. It consists of the village of Pura and the hamlets of Magliasina and Moriscio.

Pura lies nestled in chestnut tree covered slopes of the Malcantone region of Ticino. Pura overlooks Lake Lugano and boasts impressive views of the mountains Monte Bre, Monte San Salvatore and Monte Generoso. Historically the village was covered in vineyards, although with very limited land available for building purposes coupled with the high cost of land has meant that over the years many of the vineyards have largely been built upon. Pura is considered to be a rural area and is only 15 minutes from the center of Lugano and located only 10 minutes from Agno Airport. Pura is only a 15-minute walk into Italy. Being close to the border, border security is important the Swiss, security is provided by border patrols (Guarda di Confine) and even high flying observational drones or UAV's.

== Coat of arms ==
The blazon of the municipal coat of arms is Or two guns sable in slatire in chief a sieve and in base a horn both azure. The coat of arms comes from the Beroldingen family. Pura was part of the hunting area owned by the family, so the colors are from the family, with hunting symbols added.

== Demographics ==
Pura has a population (as of December 2020) of 1,346. As of 2008, 18.1% of the population are resident foreign nationals. Over the last 10 years (1997–2007) the population has changed at a rate of 23.5%.

Most of the population (as of 2000) speaks Italian (74.1%), with German being second most common (18.0%) and French being third (3.4%). Of the Swiss national languages (as of 2000), 187 speak German, 35 people speak French, 771 people speak Italian. The remainder (47 people) speak another language.

As of 2008, the gender distribution of the population was 46.6% male and 53.4% female. The population was made up of 467 Swiss men (35.8% of the population), and 142 (10.9%) non-Swiss men. There were 599 Swiss women (45.9%), and 98 (7.5%) non-Swiss women.

In 2008 there were 8 live births to Swiss citizens and 1 birth to non-Swiss citizens, and in same time span there were 5 deaths of Swiss citizens and 1 non-Swiss citizen death. Ignoring immigration and emigration, the population of Swiss citizens increased by 3 while the foreign population remained the same. There were 2 Swiss women who immigrated back to Switzerland. At the same time, there was 1 non-Swiss man and 4 non-Swiss women who immigrated from another country to Switzerland. The total Swiss population change in 2008 (from all sources, including moves across municipal borders) was an increase of 38 and the non-Swiss population change was an increase of 5 people. This represents a population growth rate of 3.4%.

The age distribution, as of 2009, in Pura is; 130 children or 10.0% of the population are between 0 and 9 years old and 137 teenagers or 10.5% are between 10 and 19. Of the adult population, 128 people or 9.8% of the population are between 20 and 29 years old. 161 people or 12.3% are between 30 and 39, 224 people or 17.2% are between 40 and 49, and 195 people or 14.9% are between 50 and 59. The senior population distribution is 157 people or 12.0% of the population are between 60 and 69 years old, 105 people or 8.0% are between 70 and 79, there are 69 people or 5.3% who are over 80.

As of 2000, there were 438 private households in the municipality, and an average of 2.3 persons per household. In 2000 there were 306 single family homes (or 75.0% of the total) out of a total of 408 inhabited buildings. There were 63 two family buildings (15.4%) and 24 multi-family buildings (5.9%). There were also 15 buildings in the municipality that were multipurpose buildings (used for both housing and commercial or another purpose).

The vacancy rate for the municipality, in 2008, was 0%. In 2000 there were 594 apartments in the municipality. The most common apartment size was the 5 room apartment of which there were 194. There were 35 single room apartments and 194 apartments with five or more rooms. Of these apartments, a total of 437 apartments (73.6% of the total) were permanently occupied, while 152 apartments (25.6%) were seasonally occupied and 5 apartments (0.8%) were empty. As of 2007, the construction rate of new housing units was 5.5 new units per 1000 residents.

The historical population is given in the following chart:

== Heritage sites of national significance ==
The Shrine at Monti Mondin is listed as a Swiss heritage site of national significance.

== Politics ==
In the 2007 federal election the most popular party was the CVP which received 26.85% of the vote. The next three most popular parties were the SP (22.7%), the FDP (20.48%) and the Ticino League (12.87%). In the federal election, a total of 432 votes were cast, and the voter turnout was 49.3%.

In the 2007 Gran Consiglio election, there were a total of 907 registered voters in Pura, of which 500 or 55.1% voted. 4 blank ballots were cast, leaving 496 valid ballots in the election. The most popular party was the PPD+GenGiova which received 114 or 23.0% of the vote. The next three most popular parties were; the PS (with 91 or 18.3%), the PLRT (with 89 or 17.9%) and the SSI (with 75 or 15.1%).

In the 2007 Consiglio di Stato election, 7 blank ballots and 1 null ballot were cast, leaving 492 valid ballots in the election. The most popular party was the PS which received 106 or 21.5% of the vote. The next three most popular parties were; the PPD (with 105 or 21.3%), the LEGA (with 102 or 20.7%) and the PLRT (with 90 or 18.3%).

== Economy ==
As of 2007, Pura had an unemployment rate of 3.33%. As of 2005, there were 21 people employed in the primary economic sector and about 4 businesses involved in this sector. 29 people were employed in the secondary sector and there were 11 businesses in this sector. 90 people were employed in the tertiary sector, with 25 businesses in this sector. There were 467 residents of the municipality who were employed in some capacity, of which females made up 42.8% of the workforce.

In 2000, there were 77 workers who commuted into the municipality and 356 workers who commuted away. The municipality is a net exporter of workers, with about 4.6 workers leaving the municipality for every one entering. About 28.6% of the workforce coming into Pura are coming from outside Switzerland. Of the working population, 7.9% used public transportation to get to work, and 66.8% used a private car.

As of 2009, there was one hotel in Pura.

== Religion ==
From the 2000 census, 743 or 71.4% were Roman Catholic, while 154 or 14.8% belonged to the Swiss Reformed Church. There are 110 individuals (or about 10.58% of the population) who belong to another church (not listed on the census), and 33 individuals (or about 3.17% of the population) did not answer the question.

== Education ==
In Pura about 79.4% of the population (between age 25 and 64) have completed either non-mandatory upper secondary education or additional higher education (either university or a Fachhochschule).

In Pura there were a total of 215 students (as of 2009). The Ticino education system provides up to three years of non-mandatory kindergarten and in Pura there were 37 children in kindergarten. The primary school program lasts for five years and includes both a standard school and a special school. In the municipality, 77 students attended the standard primary schools and 1 student attended the special school. In the lower secondary school system, students either attend a two-year middle school followed by a two-year pre-apprenticeship or they attend a four-year program to prepare for higher education. There were 41 students in the two-year middle school and 1 in their pre-apprenticeship, while 24 students were in the four-year advanced program.

The upper secondary school includes several options, but at the end of the upper secondary program, a student will be prepared to enter a trade or to continue on to a university or college. In Ticino, vocational students may either attend school while working on their internship or apprenticeship (which takes three or four years) or may attend school followed by an internship or apprenticeship (which takes one year as a full-time student or one and a half to two years as a part-time student). There were 16 vocational students who were attending school full-time and 17 who attend part-time.

The professional program lasts three years and prepares a student for a job in engineering, nursing, computer science, business, tourism and similar fields. There was 1 student in the professional program.

As of 2000, there were 2 students in Pura who came from another municipality, while 155 residents attended schools outside the municipality.
