= Lugano District =

Coordinates: 46°0′N 8°57′E

Lugano District Distretto di Lugano
- District
- Country: Switzerland
- Canton: Ticino
- Capital: Lugano

Area
  - Total: 331.8 km^{2} (128.1 sq mi)

Population (2020)
  - Total: 150,556
  - Density: 453.8/km^{2} (1,175/sq mi)
- Time zone: UTC+1 (CET)
  - Summer (DST): UTC+2 (CEST)
- Municipalities: 43

The Lugano District (Italian: Distretto di Lugano also called Luganese) is a district of Canton of Ticino, southern Switzerland. The capital is the city of Lugano.

It has a population of 150,556 (as of 31 December 2020).

== Geography ==
The Lugano District has an area, as of 1997, of 301.76 square kilometres (116.51 square miles). Of this area, 47.44 km^{2} (18.32 sq mi) or 15.7% is used for agricultural purposes, while 200.54 km^{2} (77.43 sq mi) or 66.5% is forested. Of the rest of the land, 46.05 km^{2} (17.78 sq mi) or 15.3% is settled (buildings or roads), 2.01 km^{2} (0.78 sq mi) or 0.7% is either rivers or lakes and 13.93 km^{2} (5.38 sq mi) or 4.6% is unproductive land.

Of the built-up area, housing and buildings made up 9.1% and transportation infrastructure made up 3.6%. Out of the forested land, 59.6% of the total land area is heavily forested and 3.7% is covered with orchards or small clusters of trees. Of the agricultural land, 5.7% is used for growing crops and 9.1% is used for alpine pastures. Of the water in the district, 0.2% is in lakes and 0.5% is in rivers and streams. Of the unproductive areas, 4.2% is unproductive vegetation.

== Demographics ==
The Lugano District has a population (as of December 2020) of 150,556. Of the Swiss national languages (as of 2000), 104,413 people speak Italian, 11,397 speak German, 2,683 people speak French, and 184 people speak Romansh. The remainder (9,904 people) speak another language.

As of 2008, the gender distribution of the population was 47.8% male and 52.2% female. The population was made up of 46,739 Swiss men (32.8% of the population), and 21,361 (15.0%) non-Swiss men. There were 55,315 Swiss women (38.8%), and 19,062 (13.4%) non-Swiss women.

In 2008 there were 964 live births to Swiss citizens and 364 births to non-Swiss citizens, and in the same time span, there were 884 deaths of Swiss citizens and 195 non-Swiss citizens deaths. Ignoring immigration and emigration, the population of Swiss citizens increased by 80 while the foreign population increased by 169. There were 3 Swiss men and 5 Swiss women who immigrated back to Switzerland. At the same time, there were 1224 non-Swiss men and 1025 non-Swiss women who immigrated from another country to Switzerland. The total Swiss population change in 2008 (from all sources) was an increase of 954 and the non-Swiss population change was an increase of 1387 people. This represents a population growth rate of 1.7%.

The age distribution, as of 2009, in the Lugano District is: 13,106 children or 9.2% of the population are between 0 and 9 years old and 14,319 teenagers or 10.1% are between 10 and 19. Of the adult population, 15,026 people or 10.5% of the population are between 20 and 29 years old. 20,647 people or 14.5% are between 30 and 39, 24,237 people or 17.0% are between 40 and 49, and 18,617 people or 13.1% are between 50 and 59. The senior population distribution is 16,900 people or 11.9% of the population are between 60 and 69 years old, 11,858 people or 8.3% are between 70 and 79, there are 7,767 people or 5.5% who are over 80.

In 2000 there were 39,438 single family homes (or 38.1% of the total) out of a total of 103,629 inhabited buildings. There were 12,956 two family buildings (12.5%) and 39,313 multi-family buildings (37.9%). There were also 11,922 buildings in the district that were multipurpose buildings (used for both housing and commercial or another purpose).

In 2000 there were 72,885 apartments in the district. The most common apartment size was the 3 room apartment of which there were 20,908. There were 5,376 single room apartments and 14,950 apartments with five or more rooms. Of these apartments, a total of 57,003 apartments (78.2% of the total) were permanently occupied, while 13,691 apartments (18.8%) were seasonally occupied and 2,191 apartments (3.0%) were empty.

The historical population is given in the following table:

year	population
1850	36,494
1880	39,447
1900	45,031
1950	63,110
1980	104,559
1990	115,116
2000	128,581

== Politics ==
In the 2007 federal election the most popular party was the FDP which received 26.24% of the vote. The next three most popular parties were the CVP (22.21%), the SP (17.58%) and the Ticino League (16.3%). In the federal election, a total of 38,965 votes were cast, and the voter turnout was 46.5%.

In the 2007 Ticino Gran Consiglio election, there were a total of 83,196 registered voters in the Lugano District, of which 49,848 or 59.9% voted. 722 blank ballots and 125 null ballots were cast, leaving 49,001 valid ballots in the election. The most popular party was the PLRT which received 11,883 or 24.3% of the vote. The next three most popular parties were; the PPD+GenGiova (with 8,382 or 17.1%), the LEGA (with 8,086 or 16.5%) and the SSI (with 8,006 or 16.3%).

In the 2007 Ticino Consiglio di Stato election, 487 blank ballots and 198 null ballots were cast, leaving 49,168 valid ballots in the election. The most popular party was the LEGA which received 11,371 or 23.1% of the vote. The next three most popular parties were; the PLRT (with 11,352 or 23.1%), the PS (with 8,585 or 17.5%) and the PPD (with 8,205 or 16.7%).

== Religion ==
From the 2000 census, 94,365 or 73.4% were Roman Catholic, while 9,965 or 7.7% belonged to the Swiss Reformed Church. There are 17,787 individuals (or about 13.83% of the population) who belong to another church (not listed on the census), and 6,464 individuals (or about 5.03% of the population) did not answer the question.

== Education ==
In the Lugano District there was a total of 22,026 students (as of 2009). The Ticino education system provides up to three years of non-mandatory kindergarten and in the Lugano District, there were 3,629 children in kindergarten. The primary school program lasts for five years and includes both a standard school and a special school. In the district, 6,643 students attended the standard primary schools and 246 students attended the special school. In the lower secondary school system, students either attend a two-year middle school followed by a two-year pre-apprenticeship or they attend a four-year program to prepare for higher education. There were 5,421 students in the two-year middle school and 80 in their pre-apprenticeship, while 2,441 students were in the four-year advanced program.

The upper secondary school includes several options, but at the end of the upper secondary program, a student will be prepared to enter a trade or to continue on to a university or college. In Ticino, vocational students may either attend school while working on their internship or apprenticeship (which takes three or four years) or may attend school followed by an internship or apprenticeship (which takes one year as a full-time student or one and a half to two years as a part-time student). There were 1,334 vocational students who were attending school full-time and 1,984 who attend part-time.

The professional program lasts three years and prepares a student for a job in engineering, nursing, computer science, business, tourism and similar fields. There were 248 students in the professional program.

== Circles and municipalities ==
The district of Lugano has 43 municipalities divided in 12 circles:

Circle of Lugano ovest
Coat of arms	Municipality	Population (31 December 2020)	Area km²
Lugano	Lugano (east of Cassarate river)		
Circle of Lugano est
Lugano	Lugano (west of Cassarate river)		
	Lugano	62,315	75.93

Circle of the Ceresio
Coat of arms	Municipality	Population (31 December 2020)	Area km²
Val Mara	Val Mara		11.15
Brusino Arsizio	Brusino Arsizio	451	4.04
Arogno	Arogno	986	8.50
Bissone	Bissone	948	1.82
	Total	2,385	25.53

Circle of Carona
Coat of arms	Municipality	Population (31 December 2020)	Area km²
Paradiso	Paradiso	4,368	0.89
Melide	Melide	1,830	1.67
Morcote	Morcote	734	2.80
Vico Morcote	Vico Morcote	422	1.91
Grancia	Grancia	477	0.63
Collina d'Oro	Collina d'Oro	4,604	6.15
	Total	12,435	14.0

Circle of the Magliasina
Coat of arms	Municipality	Population (31 December 2020)	Area km²
Caslano	Caslano	4,327	2.84
Pura	Pura	1,346	3.04
Neggio	Neggio	322	0.91
Magliaso	Magliaso	1,600	1.09
	Total	7,595	7.82

Circle of Agno
Coat of arms	Municipality	Population (31 December 2020)	Area km²
Agno	Agno	4,376	2.49
Bioggio	Bioggio	2,689	6.43
Muzzano	Muzzano	787	1.57
Cademario	Cademario	761	3.96
Vernate	Vernate	599	1.51
	Total	9,212	15.96

Circle of Sessa
Coat of arms	Municipality	Population (31 December 2020)	Area km²
Tresa	Tresa	3,165	11.04
	Total	3,165	11.04

Circle of Vezia
Coat of arms	Municipality	Population (31 December 2020)	Area km²
Vezia	Vezia	1,879	1.39
Cureglia	Cureglia	1,434	1.06
Cadempino	Cadempino	1,521	0.76
Lamone	Lamone	1,694	1.86
Comano	Comano	2,084	2.06
Sorengo	Sorengo	1,863	0.85
Massagno	Massagno	6,272	0.73
Savosa	Savosa	2,219	0.74
Porza	Porza	1,547	1.58
Canobbio	Canobbio	2,302	1.30
	Total	22,815	12.33

Circle of Breno
Coat of arms	Municipality	Population (31 December 2020)	Area km²
Alto Malcantone	Alto Malcantone	1,380	21.92
Aranno	Aranno	354	2.72
Lema	Lema		18.56
	Total	1,734	40.62

Circle of Capriasca
Coat of arms	Municipality	Population (31 December 2020)	Area km²
Capriasca	Capriasca	6,755	36.35
Ponte Capriasca	Ponte Capriasca	1,871	6.20
Origlio	Origlio	1,497	2.07
	Total	10,123	44.62

Circle of Taverne
Coat of arms	Municipality	Population (31 December 2020)	Area km²
Torricella-Taverne	Torricella-Taverne	3,072	5.24
Monteceneri	Monteceneri	4,535	36.9
Mezzovico-Vira	Mezzovico-Vira	1,387	10.21
Bedano	Bedano	1,538	1.87
Gravesano	Gravesano	1,359	0.69
Manno	Manno	1,290	2.38
	Total	13,181	51.16

== Merger and name changes ==
- On 14 April 2013 the former municipalities of Bogno, Cadro, Carona, Certara, Cimadera, Sonvico, and Valcolla merged into the municipality of Lugano.
- On 18 April 2021, the former municipalities of Croglio, Monteggio, Ponte Tresa, and Sessa merged to form the new municipality of Tresa.
- On 10 April 2022, the former municipalities of Maroggia, Melano and Rovio merged to form the new municipality of Val Mara.
- On 6 April 2025, the former municipalities of Astano, Bedigliora, Curio, Miglieglia and Novaggio merged to form the new municipality of Lema.
