= Léveillé =

Léveillé may refer to:

- André Léveillé (born 1933), a politician in Quebec, Canada
- André Léveillé (painter) (1880–1962), a French painter
- Augustin Abel Hector Léveillé (1863–1918), a botanist
- Joseph-Henri Léveillé (1796–1870), a French physician and mycologist
- Mathieu Léveillé (1709–1743), an executioner in Canada
- Michel Fourquin dit Léveillé (1791–1861), a farmer and political figure in Canada East
- Philippe Léveillé (born 1963), a French-Italian chef, restaurateur and television personality

== See also ==
- Leveille
