= Agno, Ticino =

Agno
- Municipality
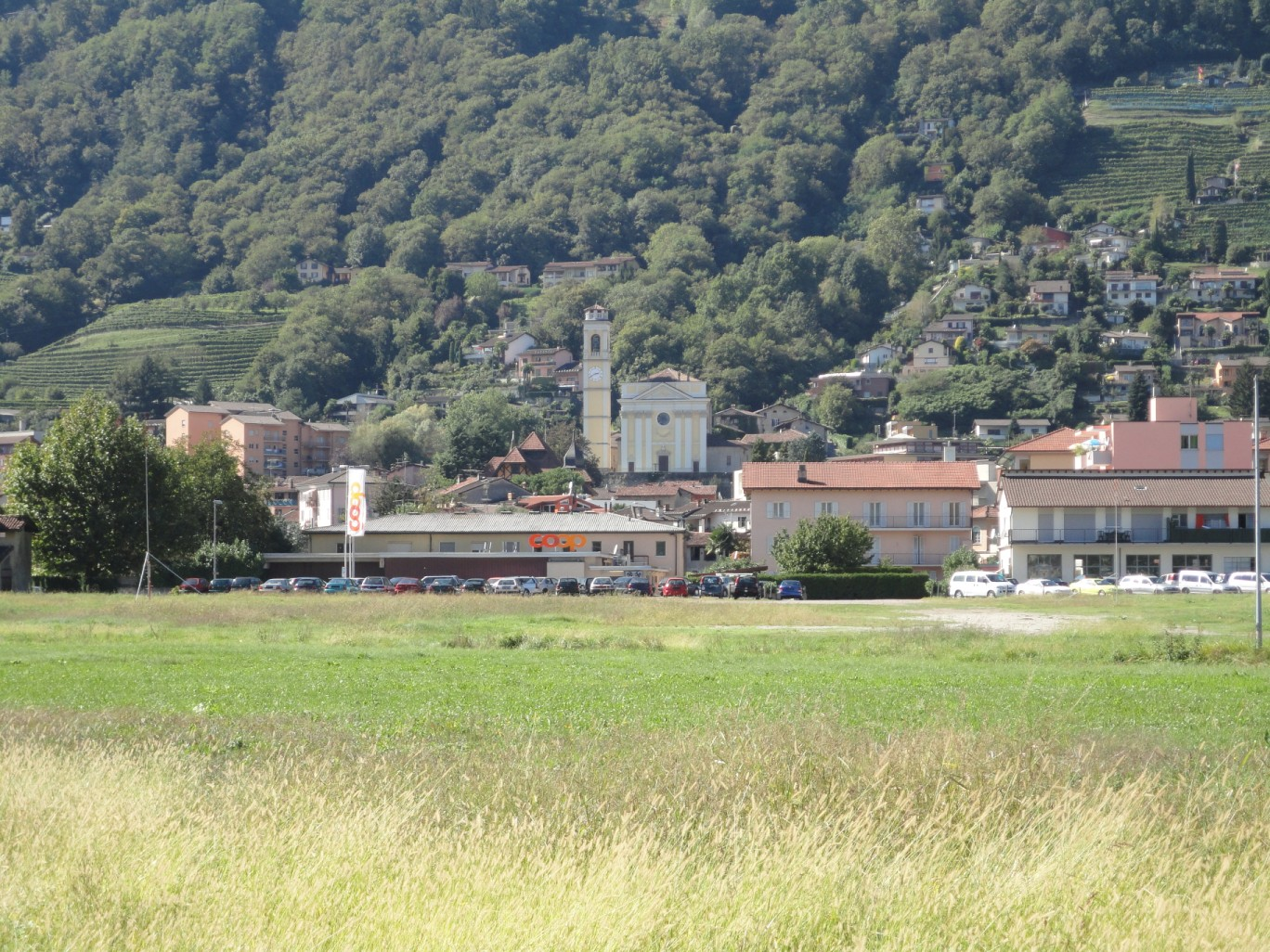
- Agno village

- Flag Coat of arms
- Location of Agno
- Location within Switzerland Location within Canton of Ticino
- Coordinates: 46°00′N 8°54′E
- Country: Switzerland
- Canton: Ticino
- District: Lugano

Government
  - Executive: Municipio with 7 members
  - Mayor: Sindaco; Thierry Morotti FDP/PRD/PLR
  - Parliament: Consiglio comunale with 27 members

Area
  - Total: 3.03 km^{2} (1.17 sq mi)
- Elevation (Church): 293 m (961 ft)

Population (December 2020)
  - Total: 4,376
  - Density: 1,440/km^{2} (3,740/sq mi)
- Time zone: UTC+01:00 (CET)
  - Summer (DST): UTC+02:00 (CEST)
- Postal codes: 6982 Agno, 6990 Cassina d'Agno
- SFOS number: 5141
- ISO 3166 code: CH-TI
- Localities: Cassina d'Agno, Mondonico, Serocca
- Surrounded by: Bioggio, Collina d'Oro, Magliaso, Muzzano, Neggio, Vernate
- Website: www.agno.ch

Agno (Italian pronunciation: [ˈaɲɲo]) is a historic town and a municipality in the district of Lugano in the canton of Ticino in Switzerland. Due to its position on Lake Lugano it is popular with tourists, and hosts summer festivals, with two hotels and several camping grounds. It is served by the Lugano-Agno airport.

The official language of Agno is Italian.

== History ==
Agno is first mentioned in 818 as Anium. It was known by its German name Eng, though this is no longer used.

Aerial view (1963)

=== Pieve of Agno ===
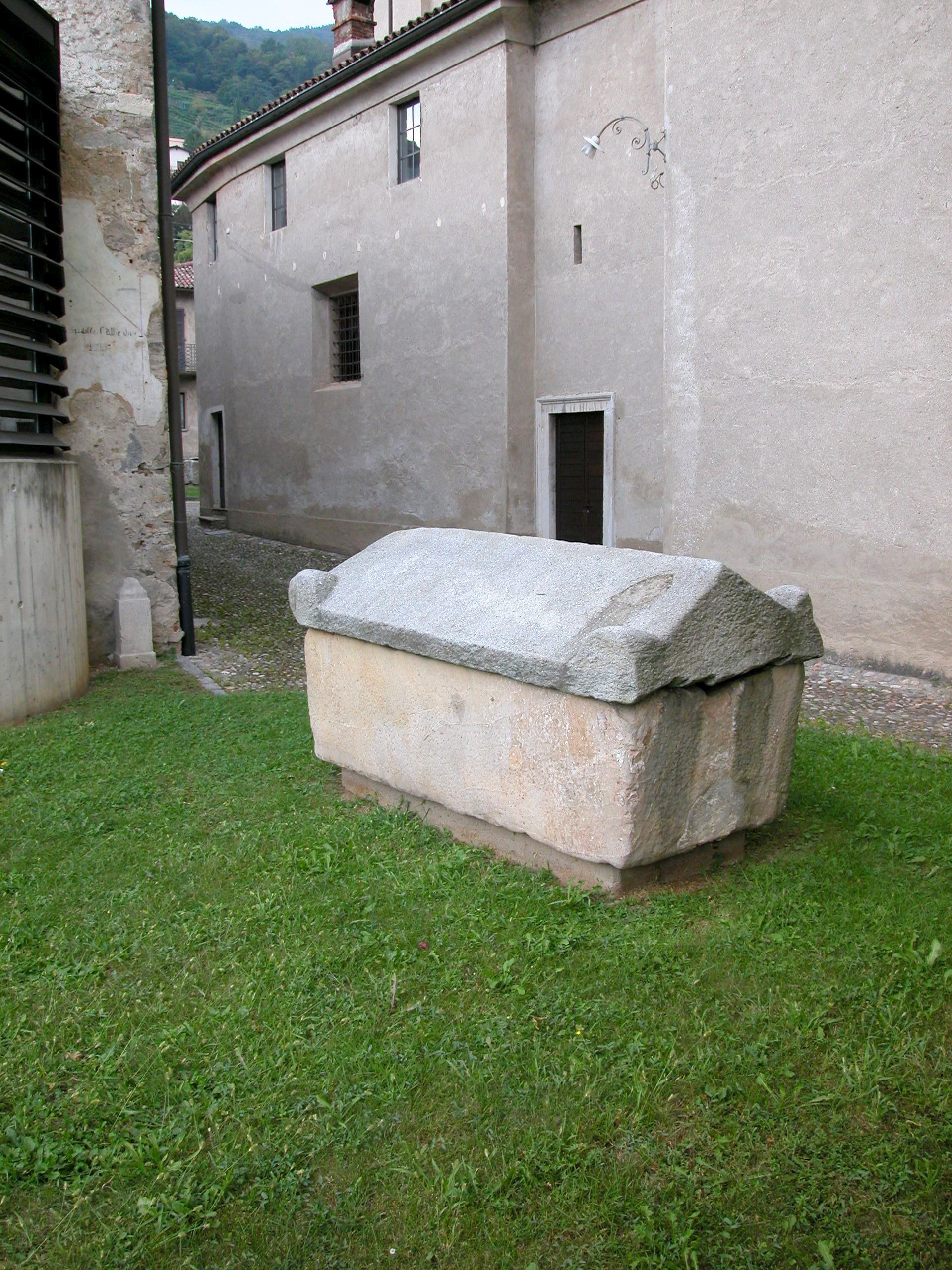
Etruscan tomb located in the churchyard of S. Giovanni Battistat

The emergence of the Pieve or Parish of Agno is related to the spread of Christianity in late-Roman era along the Milan-Como-Riva San Vitale axis. The dedication of the church to Saint John the Baptist (San Giovanni Battista) refers to its character as a baptistery. Documents from the years 735 and 818 (deed of gift by King Louis the Pious) testify to the existence of a religious center at Agno. Originally, it was probably an Ambrosian Rite church, but in 1002-04 it came into the possession of the Bishop of Como. A collegiate chapel is first mentioned in 1192. The first known pastor is Gulielmus de Merchurolo in 1288. The extent of the parish (from Bironico to Marchirolo) is mentioned in the manuscript of Sessa from 1352.

The visitation records of Bishop Giovanni Antonio Volpe of Como (1571) give a detailed report on the properties of the parishes belonging to the Pieve and the sub-parishes. On Swiss soil it included: Agno, Aranno, Arosio, Astano, Bedigliora, Bironico, Bioggio, Bosco Luganese, Breno, Cademario, Camignolo, Caslano, Castelrotto, Curio, Ison, Magliaso, Medeglia, Mezzovico, Miglieglia, Mugena Muzzano, Neggio, Novaggio, Ponte Tresa, Pura Rivera, Robasacco, S. Abbondio (Gentilino and Montagnola), S. Maria (Iseo and Cimo), Sessa, Sigirino, S. Pietro di Gravesano, Torricella Vernate, Vezio and Vira. The Pieve also included a number of villages, which are now in Italy. These included: Arbizzo, Ardena, Cadegliano, Cremenaga, Cugliate, Fabiasco, Lavena, Marchirolo, Marzio, Viconago.

Initially it was under the authority of Como, and later the Duchy of Milan. At the beginning of the 15th Century it was part of the communitas Vallis Lugani and appointed representatives to the Council of the Bailiwick. Following the Act of Mediation of 1803, the parish lost its political meaning entirely.

=== Community of Agno ===
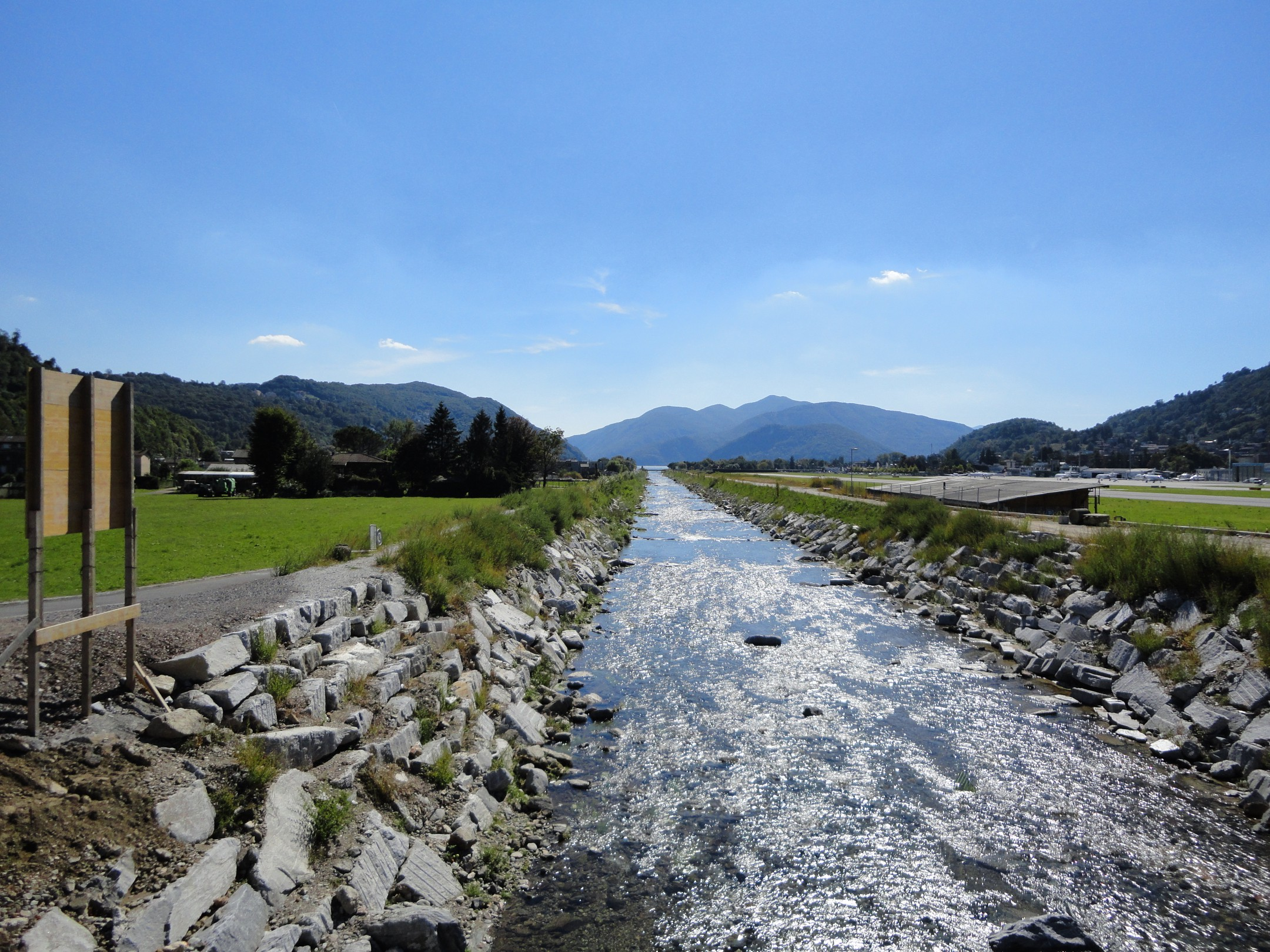
Vedeggio river at Agno. The river bed correction in 1906 opened new farm land in Agno

Because of its strategic location at the northern end of an arm of Lake Lugano and along the Varese-Ponte Tresa-Monte Ceneri road, Agno was possibly the center of a Roman Pagus. Some of the archeological finds from Roman Agno are in the local Museo plebano. As a central town, Agno became a commercial center with numerous market privileges. One of these markets, the Fair of S. Provino (second Monday in March) has survived to this day.

These holdings of the Bishop of Milan in Agno during the Middle Ages included fishing rights. These rights later went to the Bishop of Como and then to local private ownership. The fishing rights were finally removed by Swiss authorities in 1843.

The Collegiate Church of San Giovanni Battista stands on the foundations of a previous Roman building. Within the church are the relics of the patron saint, San Provino, who was the second Bishop of Como. The oldest village lay at the foot of the church, and later, the settlement extended to the hills and along the streets.

The correction of the Vedeggio river course was done in 1906, which opened up additional agricultural land in Agno. After World War II the town grew rapidly from trade and industry. The emergence of tourism as an economic factor is reflected in population growth from 1960. In 1980, the Lugano-Agno airport opened allowing scheduled flights into nearby Lugano. Its importance is continually growing both in terms of tourism in Ticino and the development of a financial center in Lugano. In 1990, there were 16,270 flights and 300,000 passengers into the airport. In 1996, the Federal Council granted additional concession, which allowed the expansion of infrastructure to accommodate 700,000 passengers annually.

== Geography ==
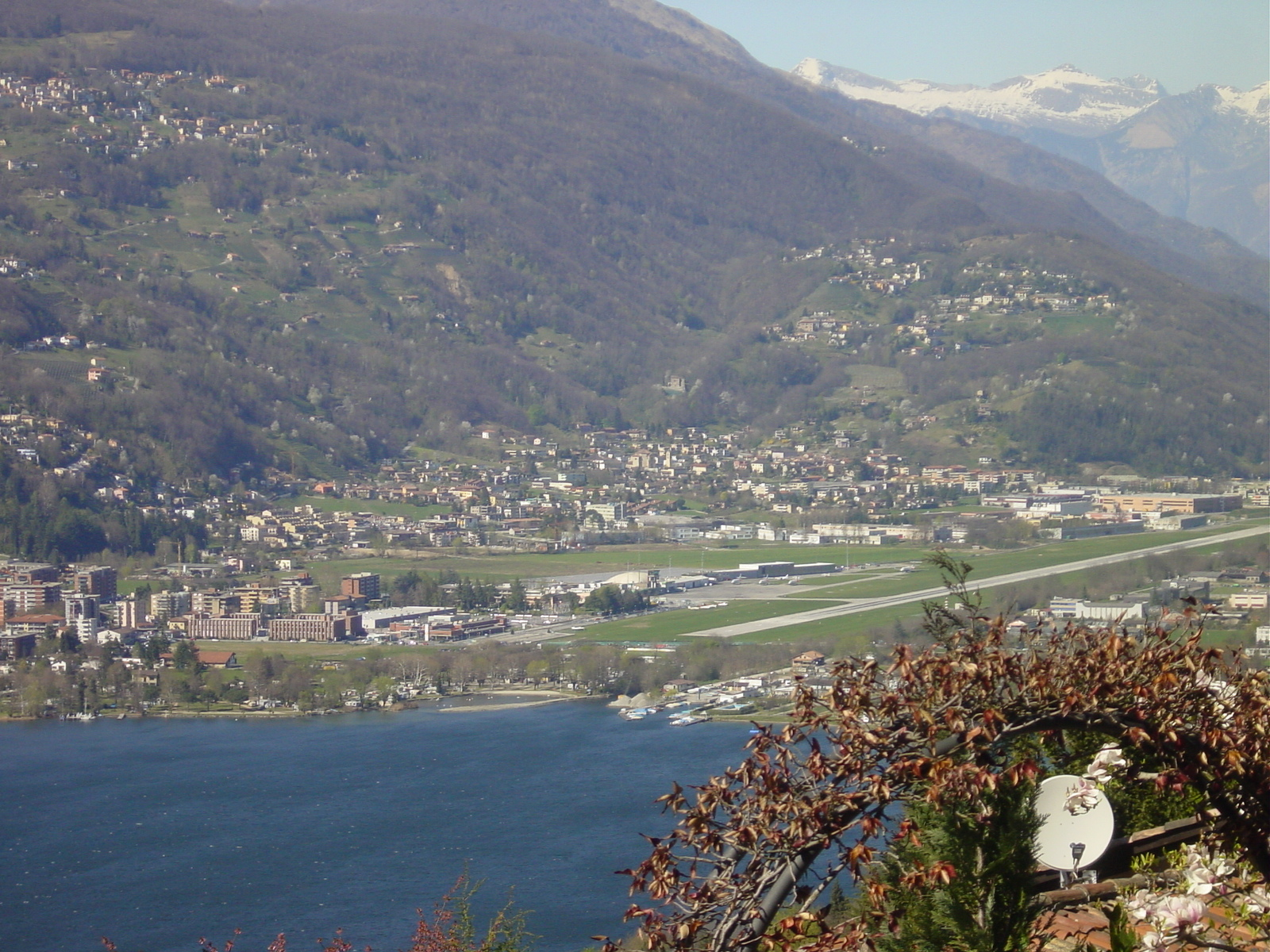
Agno and Lugano Airport

Agno has an area, as of 1997, of 2.49 square kilometers (0.96 sq mi). Of this area, 1.26 km^{2} (0.49 sq mi) or 50.6% is used for agricultural purposes, while 0.58 km^{2} (0.22 sq mi) or 23.3% is forested. Of the rest of the land, 1.2 km^{2} (0.46 sq mi) or 48.2% is settled (buildings or roads), 0.06 km^{2} (15 acres) or 2.4% is either rivers or lakes and 0.03 km^{2} (7.4 acres) or 1.2% is unproductive land.

Of the built up area, industrial buildings made up 4.4% of the total area while housing and buildings made up 25.7% and transportation infrastructure made up 11.2%. while parks, green belts and sports fields made up 6.0%. Out of the forested land, 17.3% of the total land area is heavily forested and 6.0% is covered with orchards or small clusters of trees. Of the agricultural land, 21.7% is used for growing crops, while 3.2% is used for orchards or vine crops and 25.7% is used for alpine pastures. Of the water in the municipality, 0.4% is in lakes and 2.0% is in rivers and streams. Of the unproductive areas, 1.2% is unproductive vegetation and .

The municipality is located in the Lugano district, and is the most important municipality in the Malcantone valley. It consists of the village of Agno and the settlements of Cassina, Mondonico and Serocca.

== Transport ==
The village of Agno is served by Agno station on the Lugano–Ponte Tresa railway. Serocca station, serving the eponymous settlement, is also within the municipality. Both stations are served by regular trains, operating every 15 minutes during weekday daytime, and every half hour at other times. Agno station is also served by an Autopostale bus service to Aranno and Cademario Casa di Cura.

The terminal buildings of Lugano Airport lie within the municipality of Agno, and the airport is sometimes known as Lugano-Agno Airport. The airport is linked to Lugano by a shuttle bus that meets all flights, and is a sign-posted 10-minute walk from Agno station.

== Coat of arms ==
The blazon of the municipal coat of arms is Per fess, in chief gules a cross argent and in base argent a fish naiant gules.

== Demographics ==
Agno has a population (as of December 2020) of 4,376. As of 2008, 30.5% of the population are resident foreign nationals. Over the last 10 years (1997–2007) the population has changed at a rate of 8.5%.

Most of the population (as of 2000) speaks Italian (80.3%), with German being second most common (11.1%) and French being third (2.2%). Of the Swiss national languages (as of 2000), 406 speak German, 79 people speak French, 2,934 people speak Italian, and 6 people speak Romansh. The remainder (230 people) speak another language.

As of 2008, the gender distribution of the population was 47.0% male and 53.0% female. The population was made up of 1,258 Swiss men (30.9% of the population), and 654 (16.1%) non-Swiss men. There were 1,584 Swiss women (39.0%), and 570 (14.0%) non-Swiss women.

In 2008 there were 25 live births to Swiss citizens and 17 births to non-Swiss citizens, and in same time span there were 22 deaths of Swiss citizens and 2 non-Swiss citizen deaths. Ignoring immigration and emigration, the population of Swiss citizens increased by 3 while the foreign population increased by 15. There were 8 Swiss men who emigrated from Switzerland and 2 Swiss women who immigrated back to Switzerland. At the same time, there were 34 non-Swiss men and 21 non-Swiss women who immigrated from another country to Switzerland. The total Swiss population change in 2008 (from all sources, including moves across municipal borders) was a decrease of 4 and the non-Swiss population change was an increase of 50 people. This represents a population growth rate of 1.2%.

The age distribution, as of 2009, in Agno is; 393 children or 9.7% of the population are between 0 and 9 years old and 407 teenagers or 10.0% are between 10 and 19. Of the adult population, 412 people or 10.1% of the population are between 20 and 29 years old. 677 people or 16.7% are between 30 and 39, 685 people or 16.8% are between 40 and 49, and 464 people or 11.4% are between 50 and 59. The senior population distribution is 531 people or 13.1% of the population are between 60 and 69 years old, 319 people or 7.8% are between 70 and 79, there are 178 people or 4.4% who are over 80.

As of 2000, there were 1,588 private households in the municipality, and an average of 2.2 persons per household. In 2000 there were 465 single family homes (or 58.7% of the total) out of a total of 792 inhabited buildings. There were 120 two family buildings (15.2%) and 111 multi-family buildings (14.0%). There were also 96 buildings in the municipality that were multipurpose buildings (used for both housing and commercial or another purpose).

The vacancy rate for the municipality, in 2008, was 0.65%. In 2000 there were 1,931 apartments in the municipality. The most common apartment size was the 4 room apartment of which there were 568. There were 99 single room apartments and 370 apartments with five or more rooms. Of these apartments, a total of 1,586 apartments (82.1% of the total) were permanently occupied, while 305 apartments (15.8%) were seasonally occupied and 40 apartments (2.1%) were empty. As of 2007, the construction rate of new housing units was 2.3 new units per 1000 residents.

The historical population is given in the following chart:

== Politics ==
In the 2007 federal election the most popular party was the CVP which received 25.41% of the vote. The next three most popular parties were the FDP (21.6%), the Ticino League (20.38%) and the SP (14.88%). In the federal election, a total of 899 votes were cast, and the voter turnout was 41.9%.

In the 2007 Ticino Gran Consiglio election, there were a total of 2,120 registered voters in Agno, of which 1,204 or 56.8% voted. 18 blank ballots and 5 null ballots were cast, leaving 1,181 valid ballots in the election. The most popular party was the PLRT which received 262 or 22.2% of the vote. The next three most popular parties were; the PPD+GenGiova (with 237 or 20.1%), the LEGA (with 223 or 18.9%) and the SSI (with 191 or 16.2%).

In the 2007 Ticino Consiglio di Stato election, 16 blank ballots and 6 null ballots were cast, leaving 1,181 valid ballots in the election. The most popular party was the LEGA which received 293 or 24.8% of the vote. The next three most popular parties were; the PLRT (with 247 or 20.9%), the PPD (with 238 or 20.2%) and the PS (with 164 or 13.9%).

== Economy ==
As of 2007, Agno had an unemployment rate of 4.74%. As of 2005, there were 14 people employed in the primary economic sector and about 4 businesses involved in this sector. 773 people were employed in the secondary sector and there were 41 businesses in this sector. 1,814 people were employed in the tertiary sector, with 214 businesses in this sector. There were 1,855 residents of the municipality who were employed in some capacity, of which females made up 43.5% of the workforce.

In 2000, there were 2,371 workers who commuted into the municipality and 1,261 workers who commuted away. The municipality is a net importer of workers, with about 1.9 workers entering the municipality for every one leaving. About 20.5% of the workforce coming into Agno are coming from outside Switzerland, while 0.4% of the locals commute out of Switzerland for work. Of the working population, 11.3% used public transportation to get to work, and 59.6% used a private car.

As of 2009, there were 2 hotels in Agno.

== Religion ==
From the 2000 census, 2,787 or 76.3% were Roman Catholic, while 402 or 11.0% belonged to the Swiss Reformed Church. There are 336 individuals (or about 9.19% of the population) who belong to another church (not listed on the census), and 130 individuals (or about 3.56% of the population) did not answer the question.

== Education ==
In Agno about 67.9% of the population (between age 25–64) have completed either non-mandatory upper secondary education or additional higher education (either university or a Fachhochschule).

In Agno there were a total of 631 students (as of 2009). The Ticino education system provides up to three years of non-mandatory kindergarten and in Agno there were 100 children in kindergarten. The primary school program lasts for five years and includes both a standard school and a special school. In the village, 175 students attended the standard primary schools and 9 students attended the special school. In the lower secondary school system, students either attend a two-year middle school followed by a two-year pre-apprenticeship or they attend a four-year program to prepare for higher education. There were 173 students in the two-year middle school and 4 in their pre-apprenticeship, while 50 students were in the four-year advanced program.

The upper secondary school includes several options, but at the end of the upper secondary program, a student will be prepared to enter a trade or to continue on to a university or college. In Ticino, vocational students may either attend school while working on their internship or apprenticeship (which takes three or four years) or may attend school followed by an internship or apprenticeship (which takes one year as a full-time student or one and a half to two years as a part-time student). There were 53 vocational students who were attending school full-time and 60 who attend part-time.

The professional program lasts three years and prepares a student for a job in engineering, nursing, computer science, business, tourism and similar fields. There were 7 students in the professional program.

As of 2000, there were 446 students in Agno who came from another municipality, while 131 residents attended schools outside the municipality.
