= Iseo =

Iseo may refer to:

== Acronyms ==
- International Sustainable Energy Organization (ISEO)

== Places ==
=== Italy ===
- Iseo, Lombardy, a comune in the Province of Brescia
- Lake Iseo, a lake in the Provinces of Bergamo and Brescia, Lombardy
- Provaglio d'Iseo, a comune in the Province of Brescia, Lombardy

=== South Korea ===
- Iseo-myeon (disambiguation)
- Iseo-myeon, Cheongdo, a myeon in Cheongdo County, Gyeongsangbuk-do

=== Switzerland ===
- Iseo, Switzerland, a former comune in the Canton of Ticino
