= Neggio =

- Municipality
- Flag Coat of arms
- Location of Neggio
- Location within Switzerland Location within Canton of Ticino
- Coordinates: 45°59′N 8°53′E
- Country: Switzerland
- Canton: Ticino
- District: Lugano

Government
  - Mayor: Sindaco

Area
  - Total: 0.91 km^{2} (0.35 sq mi)
- Elevation: 389 m (1,276 ft)

Population (December 2004)
  - Total: 353
  - Density: 390/km^{2} (1,000/sq mi)
- Time zone: UTC+01:00 (CET)
  - Summer (DST): UTC+02:00 (CEST)
- Postal code: 6991
- SFOS number: 5206
- ISO 3166 code: CH-TI
- Surrounded by: Agno, Caslano, Curio, Magliaso, Pura, Vernate
- Website: http://www.neggio.ch/ SFSO statistics

Neggio is a municipality in the district of Lugano in the canton of Ticino in Switzerland.

== History ==
Aerial view (1950)

Neggio is first mentioned in 807 as Nego. In 1335, it was mentioned as Negio. Tombs from the 3rd to 4th centuries suggest that there was a Roman settlement near the modern village. In the 15th century it was mentioned as a separate Vicinanza. In 1611, it split from the parish of Agno. Since 1938, there has been a small community of Dominican nuns. In January 1944, they housed Edda Ciano, the daughter of Benito Mussolini, along with her children.

The church of S. Maria dell'Annunciata has frescoes from the 14th century, which date from the previous building that was demolished in 1620. Nothing remains of the church of San Giorgio, but a chapel was built on the same hill in the 18th century.

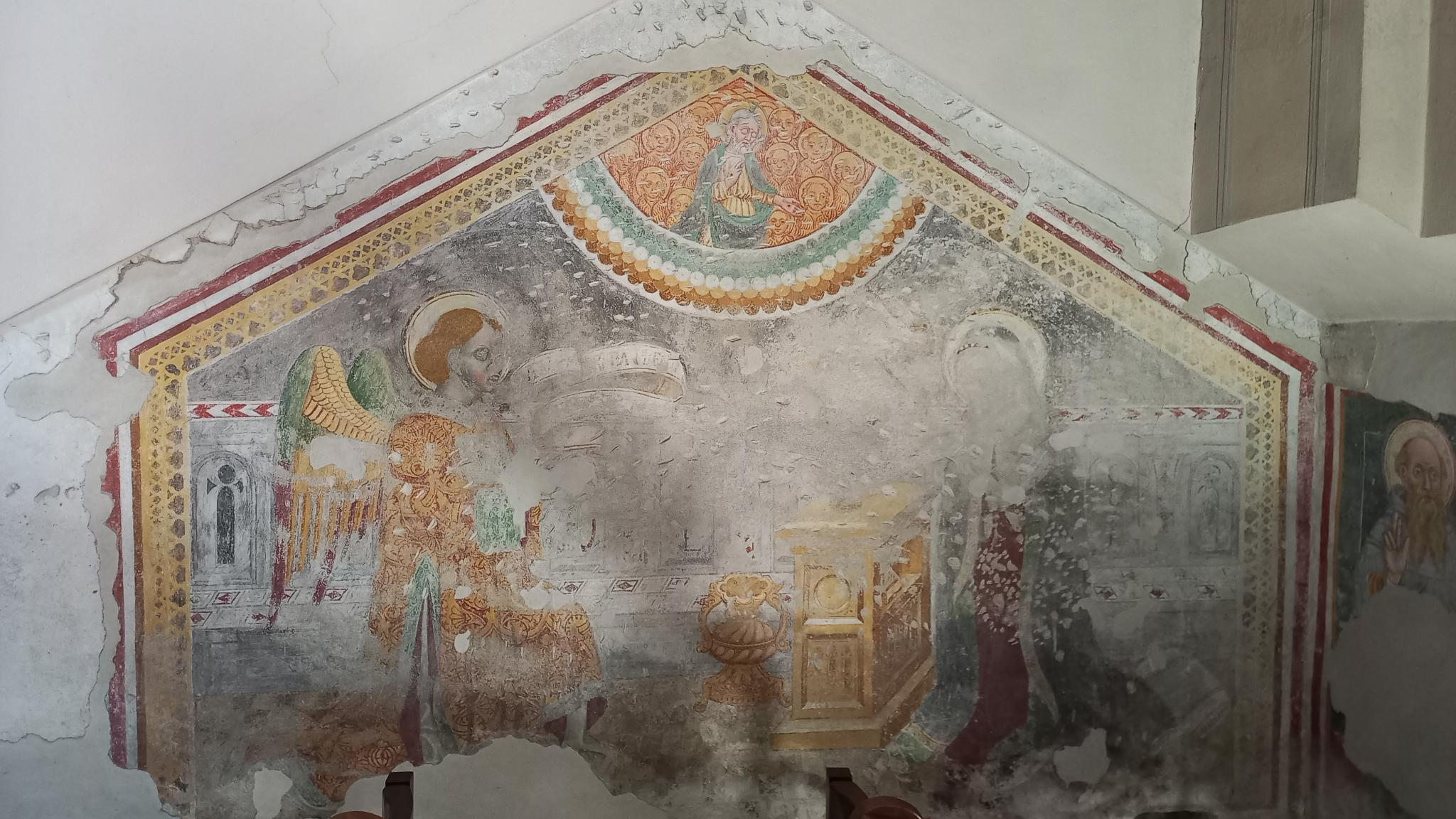
Fresco

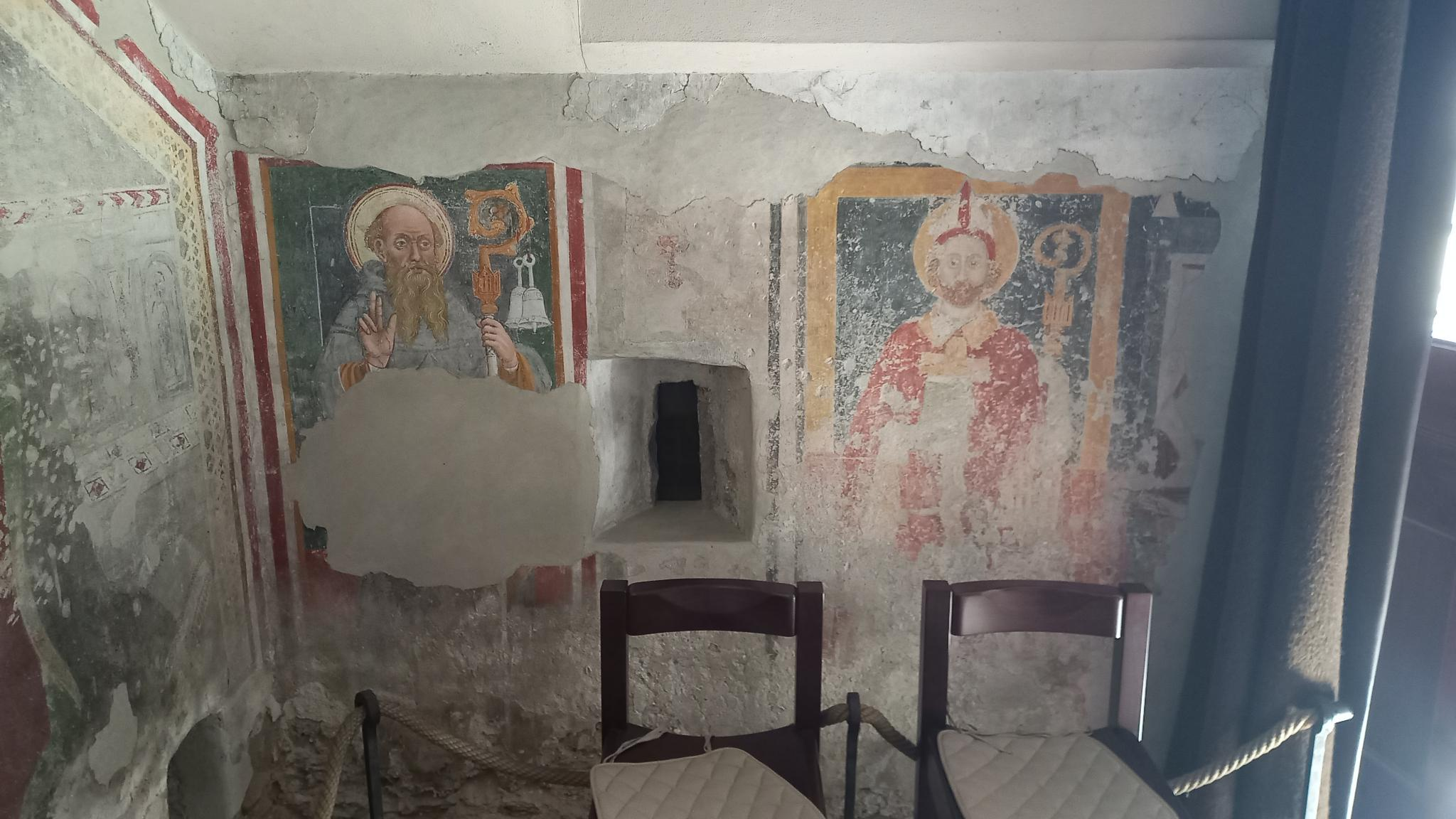
Frescoes

Historically, most of the residents worked in agriculture. At the beginning of the 21st century, most of the workers worked outside the municipality in Lugano and the Vedeggio plain. In 1956 vocational and home economics courses were introduced in the municipality. The school house, a gift from the Soldati family, has included a handicapped workshop since 1986.

== Geography ==
Neggio has an area, as of 1997, of 0.91 square kilometers (0.35 sq mi). Of this area, 0.22 km^{2} (0.085 sq mi) or 24.2% is used for agricultural purposes, while 0.6 km^{2} (0.23 sq mi) or 65.9% is forested. Of the rest of the land, 0.13 km^{2} (32 acres) or 14.3% is settled (buildings or roads), 0.01 km^{2} (2.5 acres) or 1.1% is either rivers or lakes.

Of the built up area, housing and buildings made up 8.8% and transportation infrastructure made up 3.3%. while parks, green belts and sports fields made up 2.2%. Out of the forested land, 57.1% of the total land area is heavily forested and 8.8% is covered with orchards or small clusters of trees. Of the agricultural land, 5.5% is used for growing crops, 9.9% is used for orchards or vine crops, and 8.8% is used for alpine pastures. All the water in the municipality is flowing water.

The municipality is located in the Lugano district, on a hill in the lower Malcantone valley.

== Demographics ==
Neggio has a population (as of December 2020) of 322. As of 2008, 13.5% of the population are resident foreign nationals. Over the last 10 years (1997–2007) the population has changed at a rate of 2.3%.

Most of the population (as of 2000) speaks Italian (75.9%), with German being second most common (13.6%) and Portuguese being third (3.7%). Of the Swiss national languages (as of 2000), 48 speak German, 9 people speak French, 267 people speak Italian, and 1 person speaks Romansh. The remainder (27 people) speak another language.

As of 2008, the gender distribution of the population was 48.1% male and 51.9% female. The population was made up of 143 Swiss men (41.9% of the population), and 21 (6.2%) non-Swiss men. There were 156 Swiss women (45.7%), and 21 (6.2%) non-Swiss women.

In 2008 there were 4 live births of Swiss citizens and 1 death of a Swiss citizen. Ignoring immigration and emigration, the population of Swiss citizens increased by 3 while the foreign population remained the same. There . At the same time, there was 1 non-Swiss man who emigrated from Switzerland to another country and 1 non-Swiss woman who immigrated from another country to Switzerland. The total Swiss population change in 2008 (from all sources, including moves across municipal borders) was an increase of 6 and the non-Swiss population change was a decrease of 9 people. This represents a population growth rate of -0.9%.

The age distribution, as of 2009, in Neggio is; 27 children or 7.9% of the population are between 0 and 9 years old and 37 teenagers or 10.9% are between 10 and 19. Of the adult population, 32 people or 9.4% of the population are between 20 and 29 years old. 53 people or 15.5% are between 30 and 39, 71 people or 20.8% are between 40 and 49, and 33 people or 9.7% are between 50 and 59. The senior population distribution is 42 people or 12.3% of the population are between 60 and 69 years old, 27 people or 7.9% are between 70 and 79, there are 19 people or 5.6% who are over 80.

As of 2000, there were 137 private households in the municipality, and an average of 2.4 persons per household. In 2000 there were 75 single family homes (or 67.6% of the total) out of a total of 111 inhabited buildings. There were 16 two family buildings (14.4%) and 13 multi-family buildings (11.7%). There were also 7 buildings in the municipality that were multipurpose buildings (used for both housing and commercial or another purpose).

The vacancy rate for the municipality, in 2008, was 2.06%. In 2000 there were 183 apartments in the municipality. The most common apartment size was the 5 room apartment of which there were 62. There were 5 single room apartments and 62 apartments with five or more rooms. Of these apartments, a total of 137 apartments (74.9% of the total) were permanently occupied, while 44 apartments (24.0%) were seasonally occupied and 2 apartments (1.1%) were empty. As of 2007, the construction rate of new housing units was 0 new units per 1000 residents.

The historical population is given in the following chart:

== Politics ==
In the 2007 federal election the most popular party was the CVP which received 49.49% of the vote. The next three most popular parties were the FDP (16.1%), the SP (11.93%) and the Ticino League (8.51%). In the federal election, a total of 140 votes were cast, and the voter turnout was 54.5%.

In the 2007 Gran Consiglio election, there were a total of 254 registered voters in Neggio, of which 187 or 73.6% voted. 1 blank ballot was cast, leaving 186 valid ballots in the election. The most popular party was the PPD+GenGiova which received 74 or 39.8% of the vote. The next three most popular parties were; the SSI (with 34 or 18.3%), the PS (with 29 or 15.6%) and the PLRT (with 21 or 11.3%).

In the 2007 Consiglio di Stato election, The most popular party was the PPD which received 79 or 42.2% of the vote. The next three most popular parties were; the LEGA (with 29 or 15.5%), the PS (with 26 or 13.9%) and the SSI (with 24 or 12.8%).

== Economy ==
As of 2007, Neggio had an unemployment rate of 3.6%. As of 2005, there were 3 people employed in the primary economic sector and about 1 business involved in this sector. 13 people were employed in the secondary sector and there were 3 businesses in this sector. 60 people were employed in the tertiary sector, with 10 businesses in this sector. There were 161 residents of the municipality who were employed in some capacity, of which females made up 40.4% of the workforce.

In 2000, there were 92 workers who commuted into the municipality and 115 workers who commuted away. The municipality is a net exporter of workers, with about 1.3 workers leaving the municipality for every one entering. About 12.0% of the workforce coming into Neggio are coming from outside Switzerland. Of the working population, 5% used public transportation to get to work, and 64% used a private car.

As of 2009, there was one hotel in Neggio.

== Religion ==
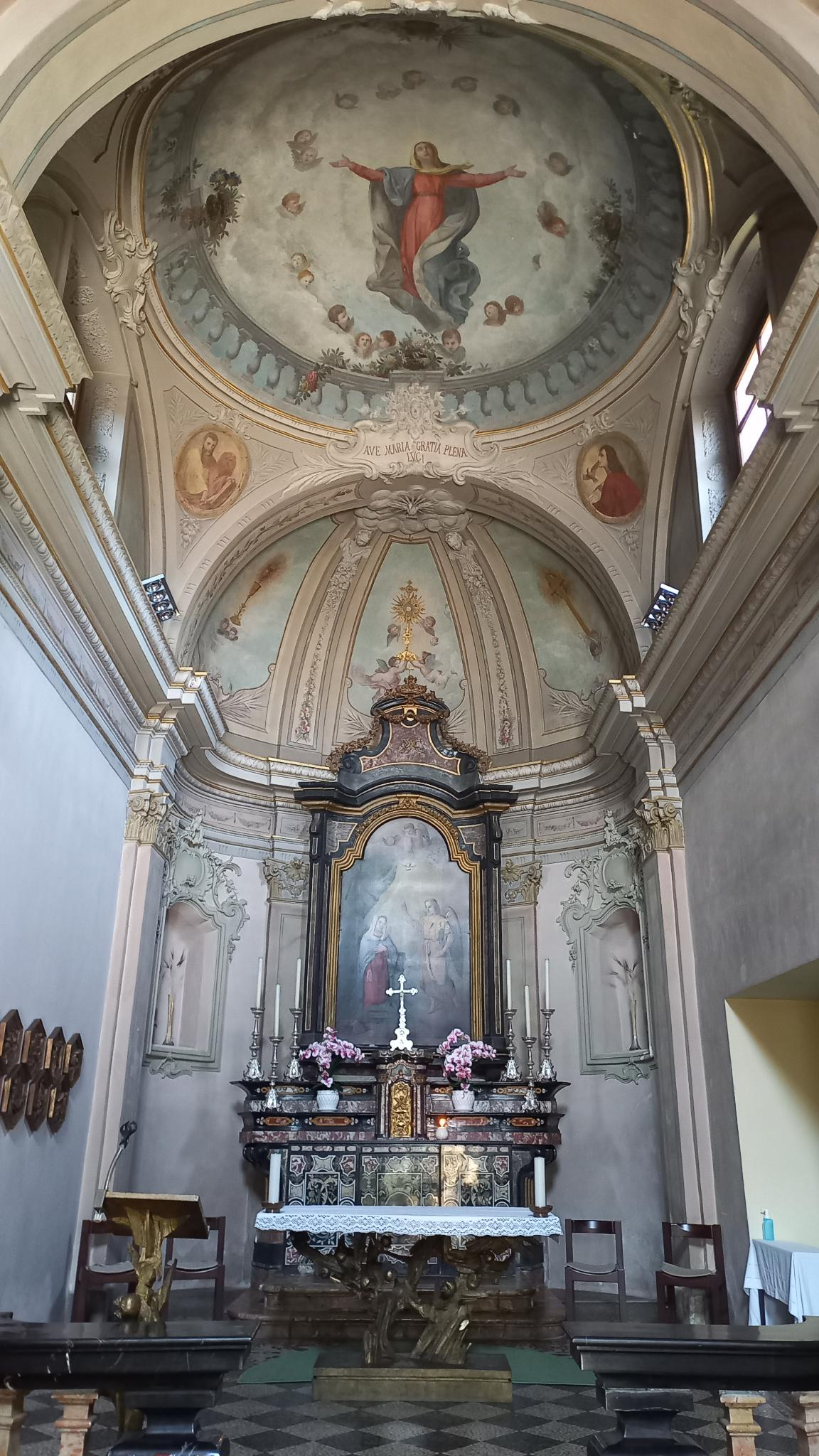
Roman-catholic church Santa Maria Annunziata, altar

From the 2000 census, 268 or 76.1% were Roman Catholic, while 36 or 10.2% belonged to the Swiss Reformed Church. There are 36 individuals (or about 10.23% of the population) who belong to another church (not listed on the census), and 12 individuals (or about 3.41% of the population) did not answer the question.

== Education ==
In Neggio about 70.4% of the population (between age 25 and 64) have completed either non-mandatory upper secondary education or additional higher education (either university or a Fachhochschule).

In Neggio there were a total of 61 students (as of 2009). The Ticino education system provides up to three years of non-mandatory kindergarten and in Neggio there were 5 children in kindergarten. The primary school program lasts for five years. In the municipality, 13 students attended the standard primary schools. In the lower secondary school system, students either attend a two-year middle school followed by a two-year pre-apprenticeship or they attend a four-year program to prepare for higher education. There were 15 students in the two-year middle school, while 15 students were in the four-year advanced program.

The upper secondary school includes several options, but at the end of the upper secondary program, a student will be prepared to enter a trade or to continue on to a university or college. In Ticino, vocational students may either attend school while working on their internship or apprenticeship (which takes three or four years) or may attend school followed by an internship or apprenticeship (which takes one year as a full-time student or one and a half to two years as a part-time student). There were 5 vocational students who were attending school full-time and 6 who attend part-time.

The professional program lasts three years and prepares a student for a job in engineering, nursing, computer science, business, tourism and similar fields. There were 2 students in the professional program.

As of 2000, there were 16 students in Neggio who came from another municipality, while 31 residents attended schools outside the municipality.
