= Bioggio =

- Municipality
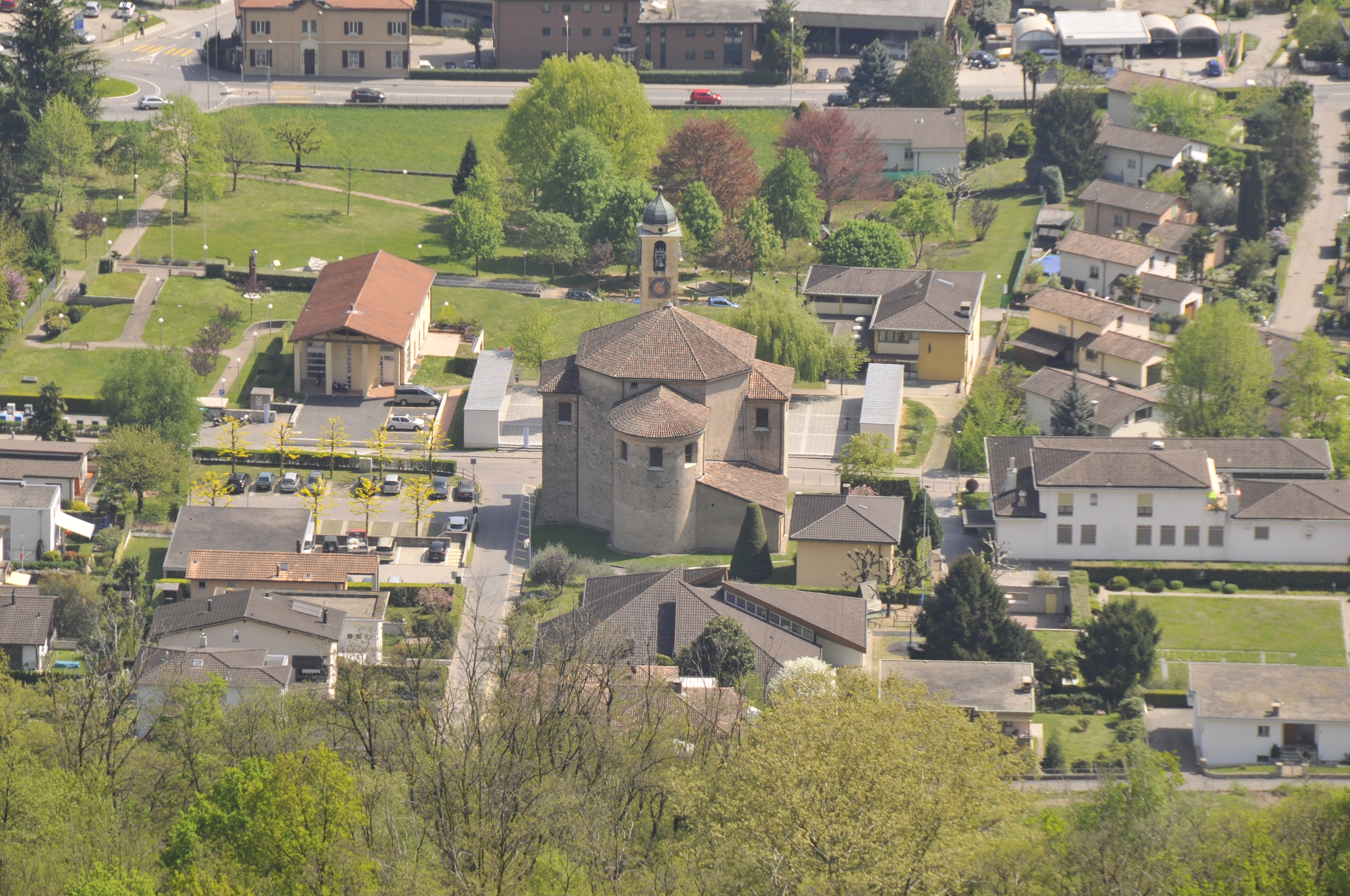

- Flag Coat of arms
- Location of Bioggio
- Location within Switzerland Location within Canton of Ticino
- Coordinates: 46°01′N 8°54′E
- Country: Switzerland
- Canton: Ticino
- District: Lugano

Government
  - Mayor: Sindaco

Area
  - Total: 6.43 km^{2} (2.48 sq mi)
- Elevation: 314 m (1,030 ft)

Population (December 2004)
  - Total: 2,276
  - Density: 354/km^{2} (917/sq mi)
- Time zone: UTC+01:00 (CET)
  - Summer (DST): UTC+02:00 (CEST)
- Postal code: 6934
- SFOS number: 5151
- ISO 3166 code: CH-TI
- Surrounded by: Agno, Alto Malcantone, Aranno, Cademario, Iseo, Lugano, Manno, Muzzano, Vernate, Vezia
- Website: www.bioggio.ch

Bioggio is a municipality in the district of Lugano, in the canton of Ticino in Switzerland.

The municipality was created in 2004 with the union of old town of Bioggio with Bosco Luganese and Cimo. In 2008, Iseo chose to be part of the municipality and be aggregated with the other old municipalities.

== History ==
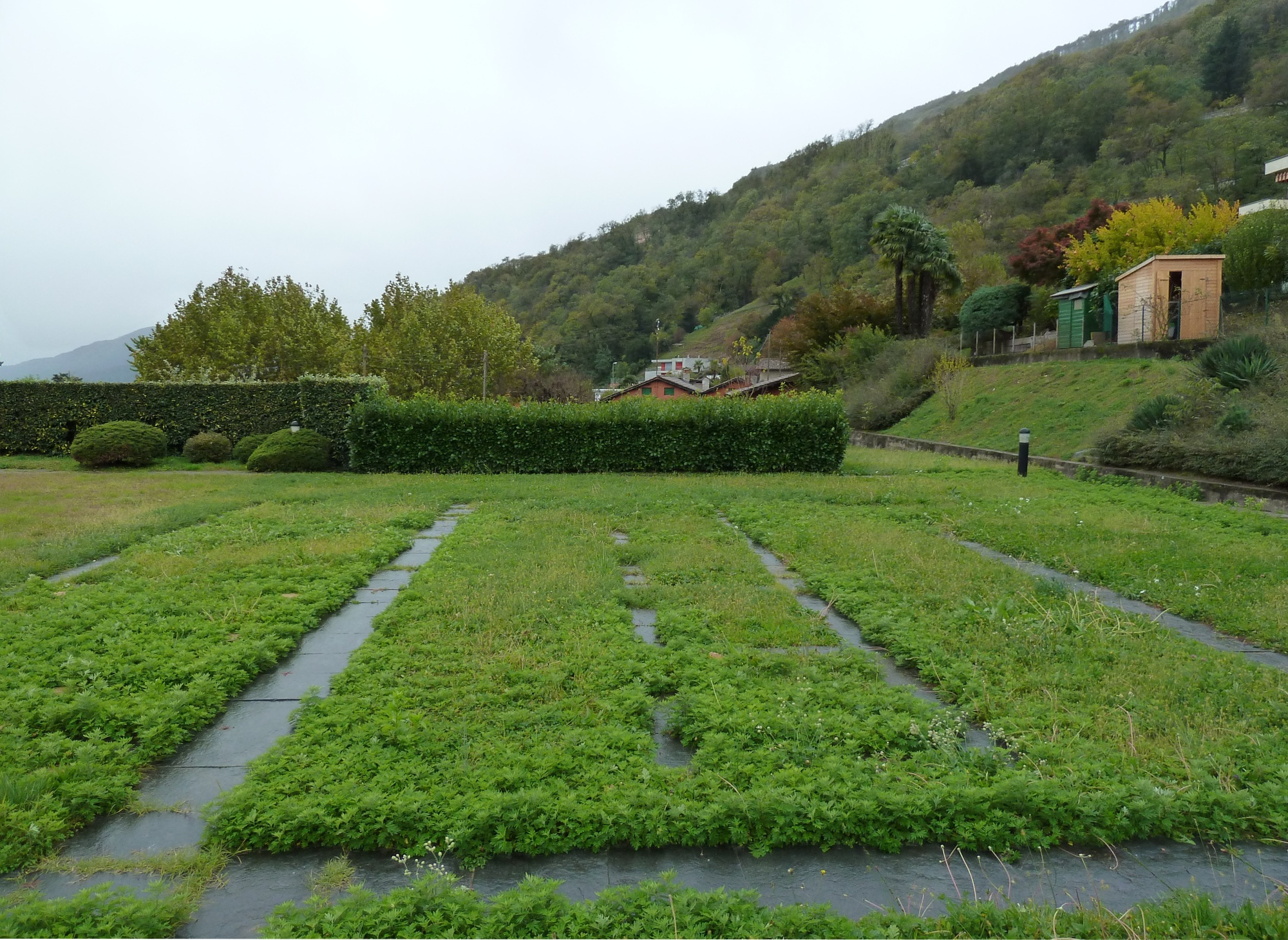
Site of the Roman baths

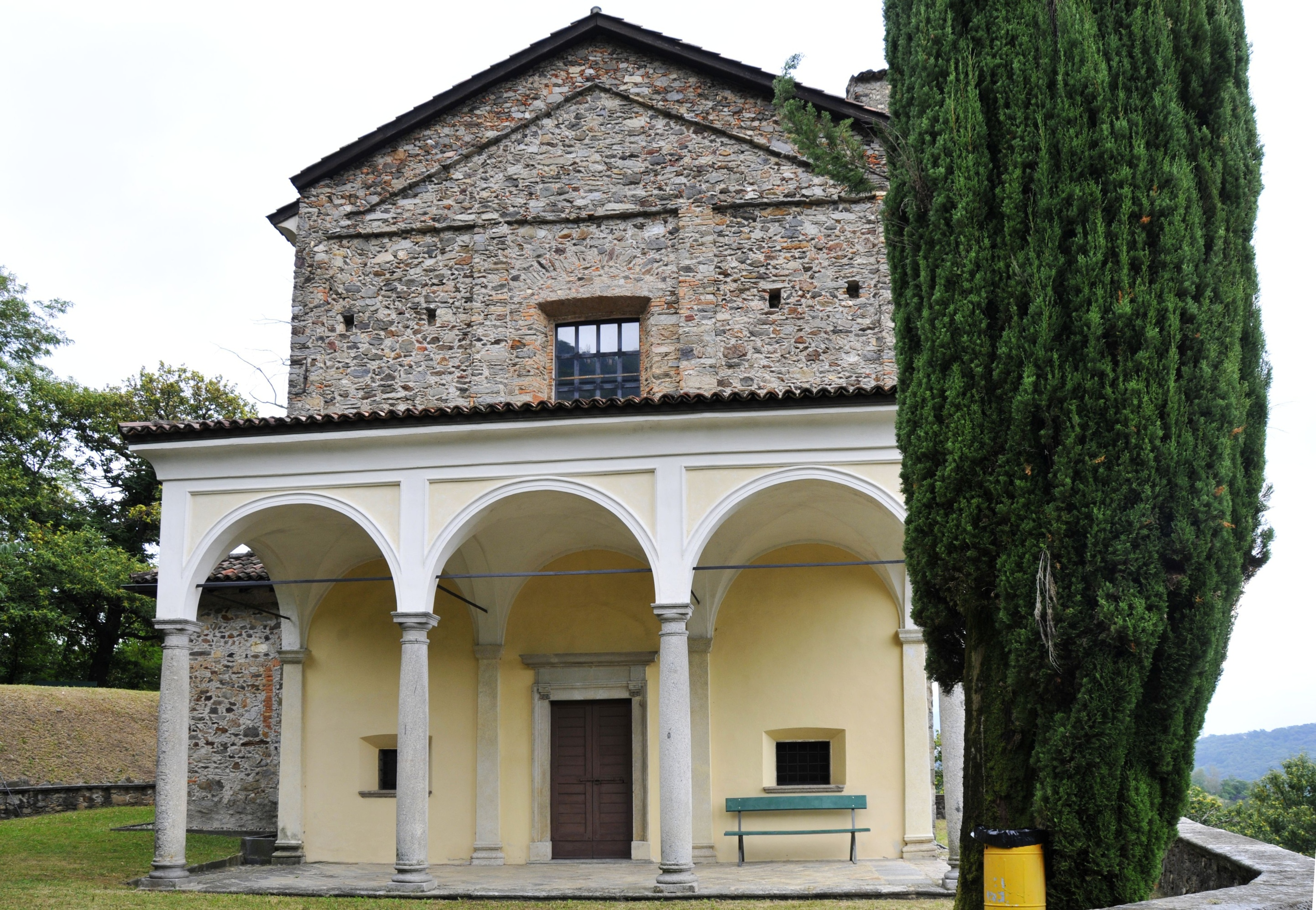
Chapel of S. Ilario

Bioggio is first mentioned in 1335 as Biegio. Finds from the Roman era bear witness to the former importance of Bioggio. In 1962 a farm house from the 3rd century was discovered, and in 1992 a market building with baths was discovered. Equally important are the recent discoveries made in the restoration of the chapel of S. Ilario, where the remains of a wooden religious building from the 8th century were found. In the Middle Ages noble families from Comacina and Lugano owned extensive property in Bioggio. The old mansions of the counts of Riva and Rusca, and a country estate for the Avogadro family from Como. The church had extensive holdings as well. In the 13th century the monastery of S. Maria in Torello (Carona) owned numerous rental houses and farms. In the 17th century these holdings were transferred to the monastery of S. Antonio in Lugano. In 1852 this property was confiscated by the Canton and auctioned.

In 1261, the church of S. Maurizio is mentioned. A series of excavations in 1997–98 discovered that the foundations can be dated back to the 5th–6th century. The new parish church rebuilt in 1773–91 in a classicist style, but the tower is from the older church. The S. Ilario chapel on the hill of the same name was extended in 1680 and remained unchanged since then.

Historically, Bioggio was located on the transit axis (Strada Regina) from Ponte Tresa to Monte Ceneri pass. Today, it has highway access and part of the Lugano-Agno airport and a freight station of the Swiss Federal Railways are located in the municipality. Since 1912, it has been served by the regional railway Lugano-Ponte Tresa line. In the 1960s, a major industrial zone was built in the valley. It is now part of the agglomeration between Ponte Tresa and Rivera.

== Geography ==
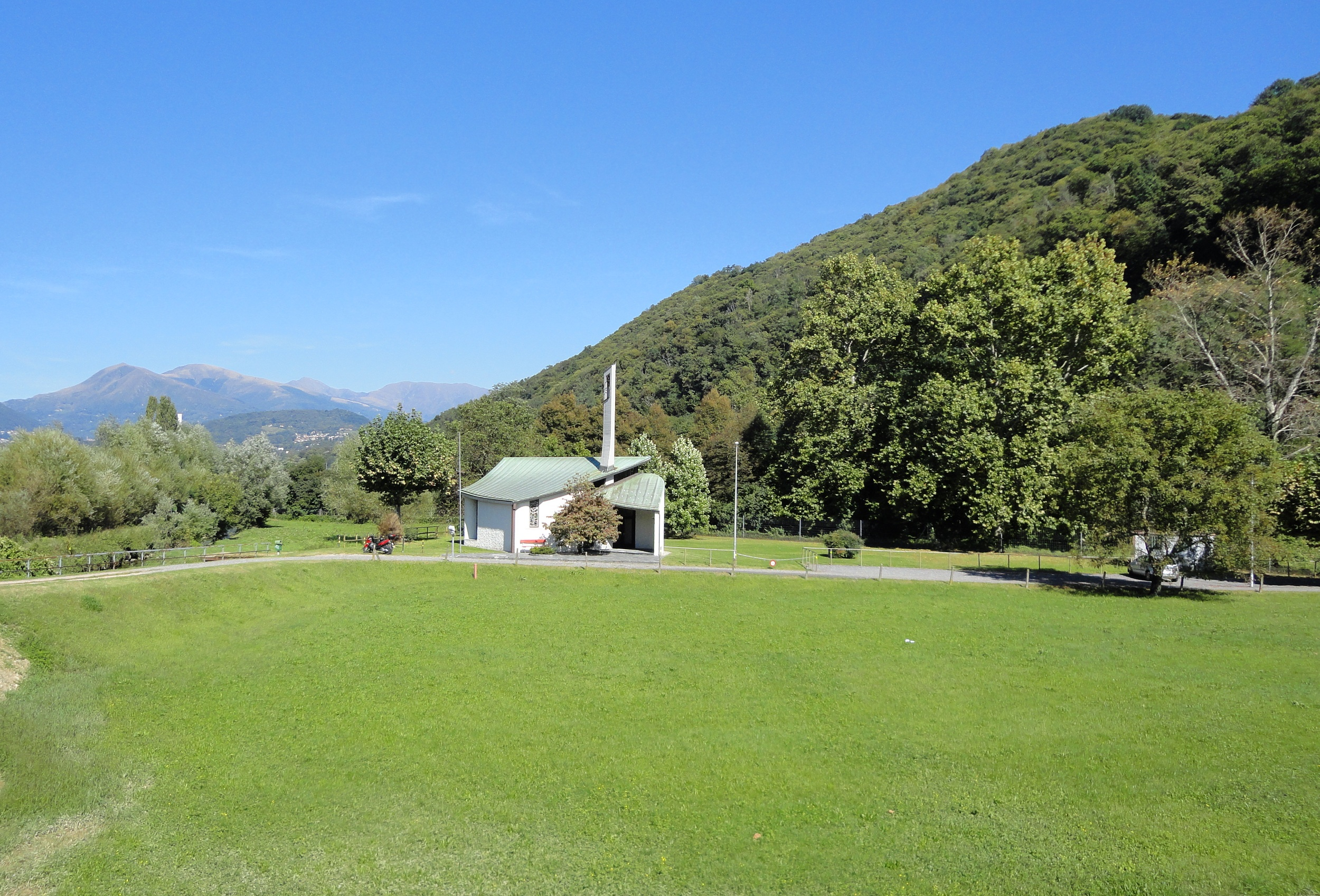
Church and countryside near Bioggio

Bioggio has an area, as of 1997, of 6.43 square kilometers (2.48 sq mi). Of this area, 1.33 km^{2} (0.51 sq mi) or 20.7% is used for agricultural purposes, while 0.8 km^{2} (0.31 sq mi) or 12.4% is forested. Of the rest of the land, 1.19 km^{2} (0.46 sq mi) or 18.5% is settled (buildings or roads), 0.05 km^{2} (12 acres) or 0.8% is either rivers or lakes and 0.02 km^{2} (4.9 acres) or 0.3% is unproductive land.

Of the built up area, industrial buildings made up 3.9% of the total area while housing and buildings made up 5.4% and transportation infrastructure made up 7.0%. Power and water infrastructure as well as other special developed areas made up 1.9% of the area Out of the forested land, 9.6% of the total land area is heavily forested and 2.8% is covered with orchards or small clusters of trees. Of the agricultural land, 13.1% is used for growing crops, while 2.2% is used for orchards or vine crops and 5.4% is used for alpine pastures. All the water in the municipality is flowing water.

The municipality is located in the Lugano district, in the lower Vedeggio valley. It consists of the village of Bioggio and the hamlets of Gaggio and Mulini. In 2004 Cimo and Bosco Luganese merged into Bioggio.

== Coat of arms ==
The present coat of arms of the municipality was adopted in 2004, replacing the arms of the three previous municipalities. The blazon, which combines elements from the older arms, is Per pale gules a sword point downwards or and azure an ash tree of the second, in base a barrulet wavy abased argent and in centre base a fleur de lis of the same banded or.

== Demographics ==
Bioggio has a population (as of December 2020) of 2,689. As of 2008, 17.9% of the population are resident foreign nationals. Over the last 10 years (1997–2007) the population has changed at a rate of 13.5%.

Most of the population (as of 2000) speaks Italian (85.1%), with German being second most common (9.7%) and French being third (1.6%). Of the Swiss national languages (as of 2000), 118 speak German, 22 people speak French, 1,312 people speak Italian, and 1 person speaks Romansh. The remainder (51 people) speak another language.

As of 2008, the gender distribution of the population was 47.1% male and 52.9% female. The population was made up of 912 Swiss men (37.8% of the population), and 225 (9.3%) non-Swiss men. There were 1,081 Swiss women (44.8%), and 197 (8.2%) non-Swiss women.

In 2008 there were 15 live births to Swiss citizens and 1 birth to non-Swiss citizens, and in same time span there were 15 deaths of Swiss citizens and 1 non-Swiss citizen death. Ignoring immigration and emigration, the population of Swiss citizens remained the same while the foreign population remained the same. There was 1 Swiss man who immigrated back to Switzerland and 1 Swiss woman who emigrated from Switzerland. At the same time, there were 6 non-Swiss men and 11 non-Swiss women who immigrated from another country to Switzerland. The total Swiss population change in 2008 (from all sources, including moves across municipal borders) was an increase of 18 and the non-Swiss population change was a decrease of 17 people. This represents a population growth rate of 0.1%.

The age distribution, as of 2009, in Bioggio is; 222 children or 9.2% of the population are between 0 and 9 years old and 262 teenagers or 10.8% are between 10 and 19. Of the adult population, 241 people or 10.0% of the population are between 20 and 29 years old. 334 people or 13.8% are between 30 and 39, 449 people or 18.6% are between 40 and 49, and 336 people or 13.9% are between 50 and 59. The senior population distribution is 270 people or 11.2% of the population are between 60 and 69 years old, 178 people or 7.4% are between 70 and 79, there are 123 people or 5.1% who are over 80.

As of 2000, there were 861 private households in the municipality, and an average of 2.4 persons per household. In 2000 there were 242 single family homes (or 63.7% of the total) out of a total of 380 inhabited buildings. There were 75 two family buildings (19.7%) and 39 multi-family buildings (10.3%). There were also 24 buildings in the municipality that were multipurpose buildings (used for both housing and commercial or another purpose).

The vacancy rate for the municipality, in 2008, was 0.28%. In 2000 there were 690 apartments in the municipality. The most common apartment size was the 4 room apartment of which there were 200. There were 20 single room apartments and 191 apartments with five or more rooms. Of these apartments, a total of 625 apartments (90.6% of the total) were permanently occupied, while 26 apartments (3.8%) were seasonally occupied and 39 apartments (5.7%) were empty. As of 2007, the construction rate of new housing units was 0.9 new units per 1000 residents.

The historical population is given in the following table:

year	population
1599	c. 250
1801	323
1850	442
1900	568
1950	644
2000	1,504

== Heritage Sites of national significance ==
The Roman Cult Site and Church of S. Maurizio are listed as Swiss heritage sites of national significance. The entire village of Iseo is listed on the Inventory of Swiss Heritage Sites.

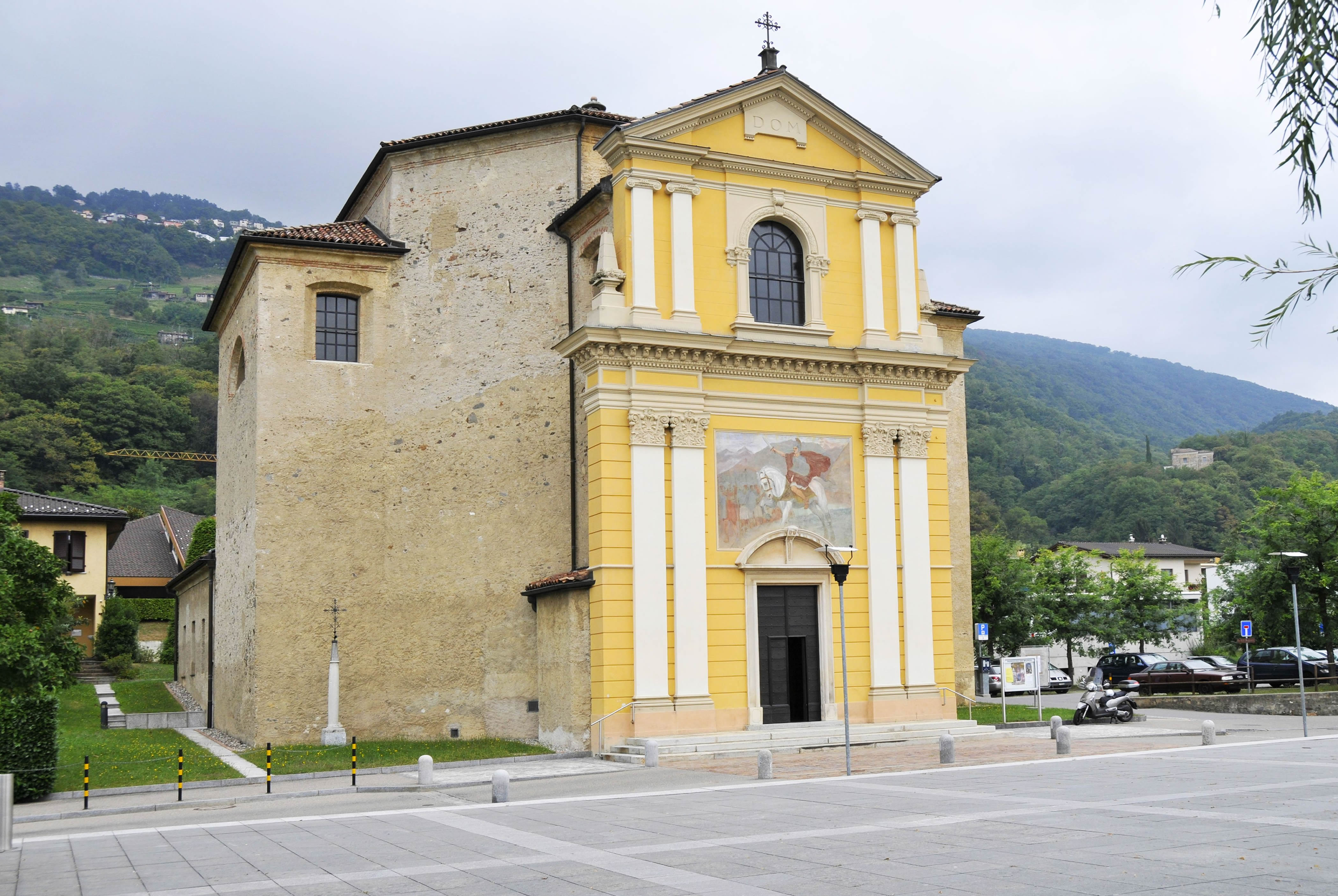
Front facade of S. Maurizio

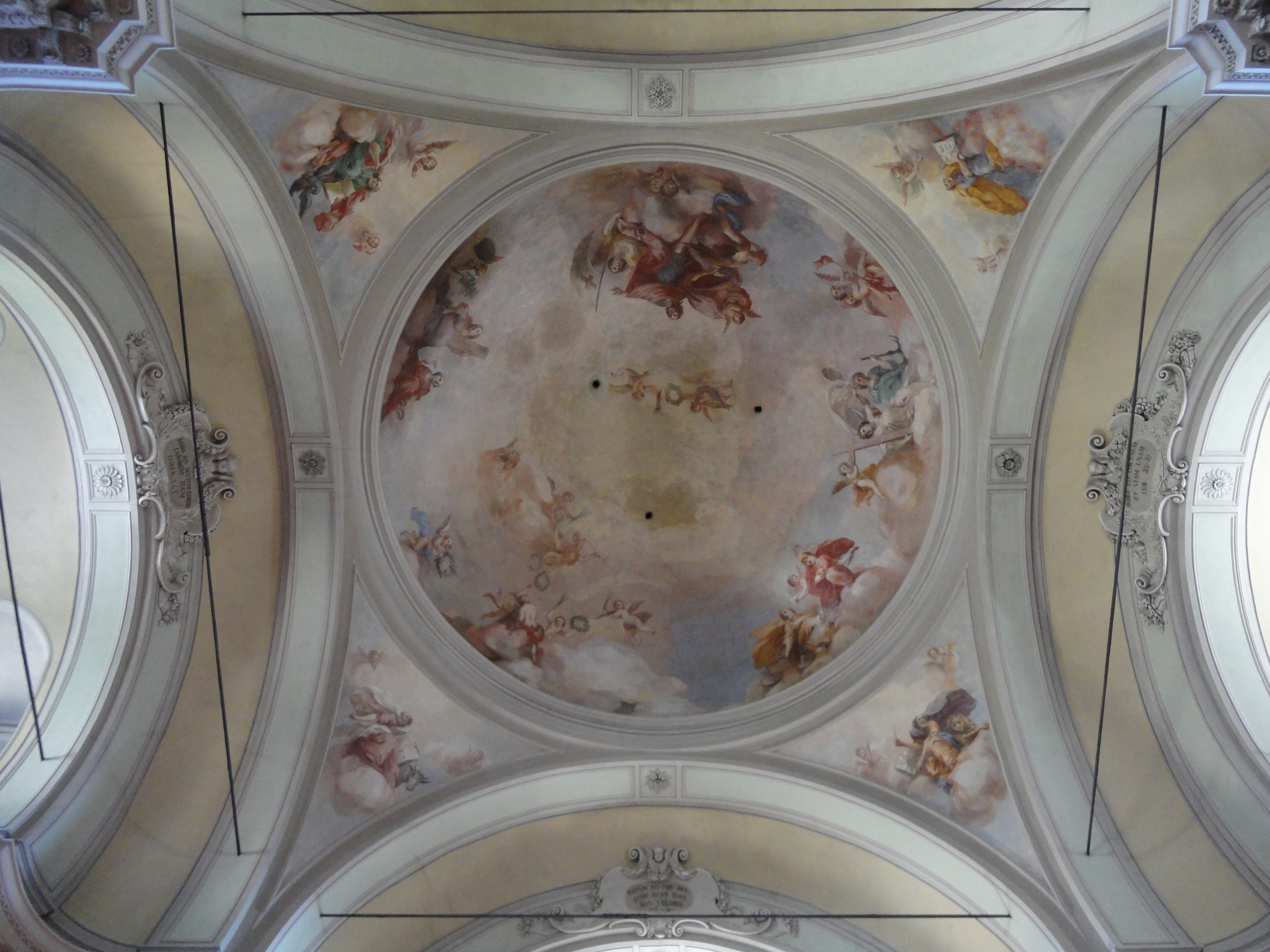
Interior of S. Maurizio

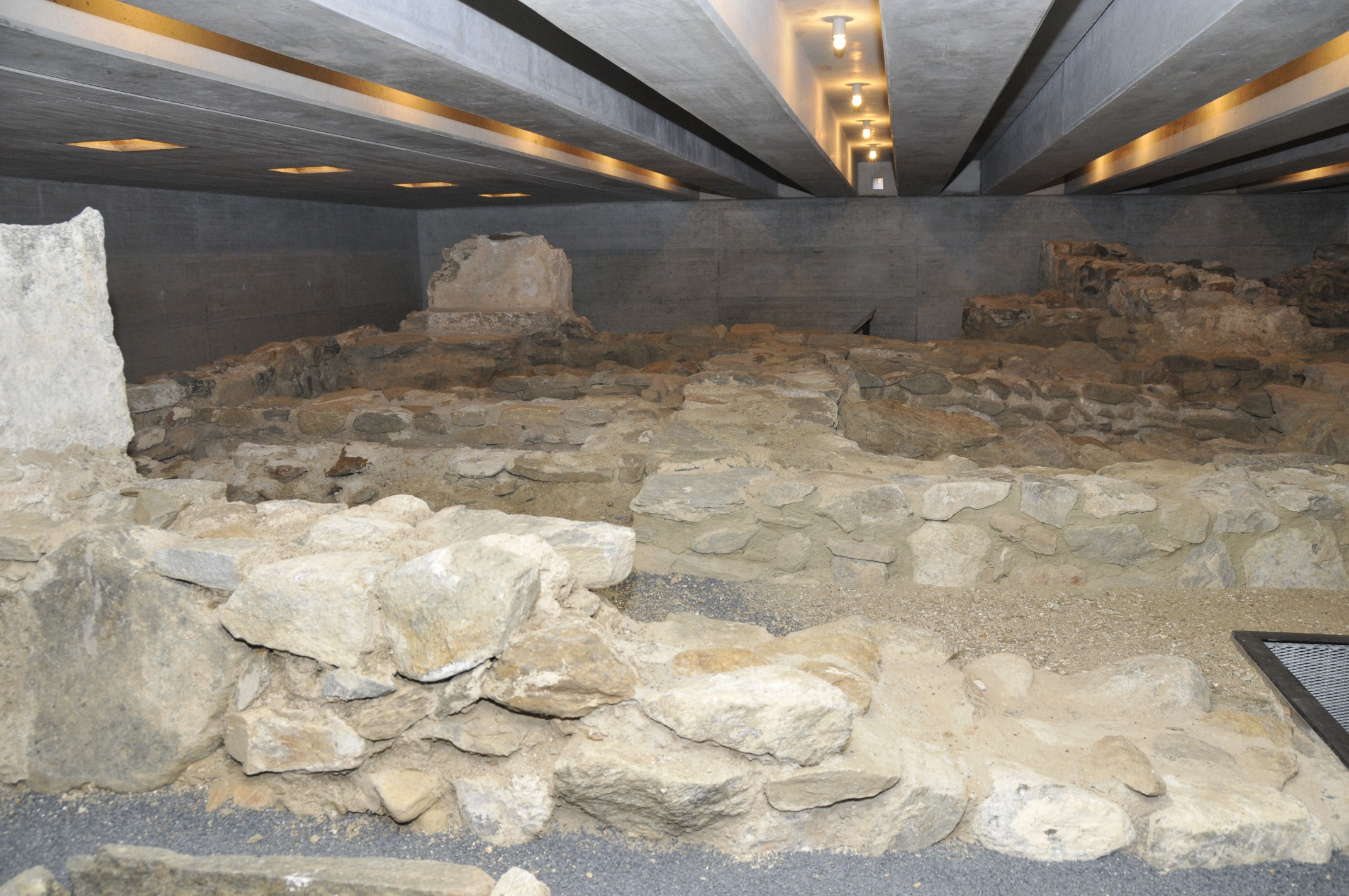
Archeological site under S. Maurizio

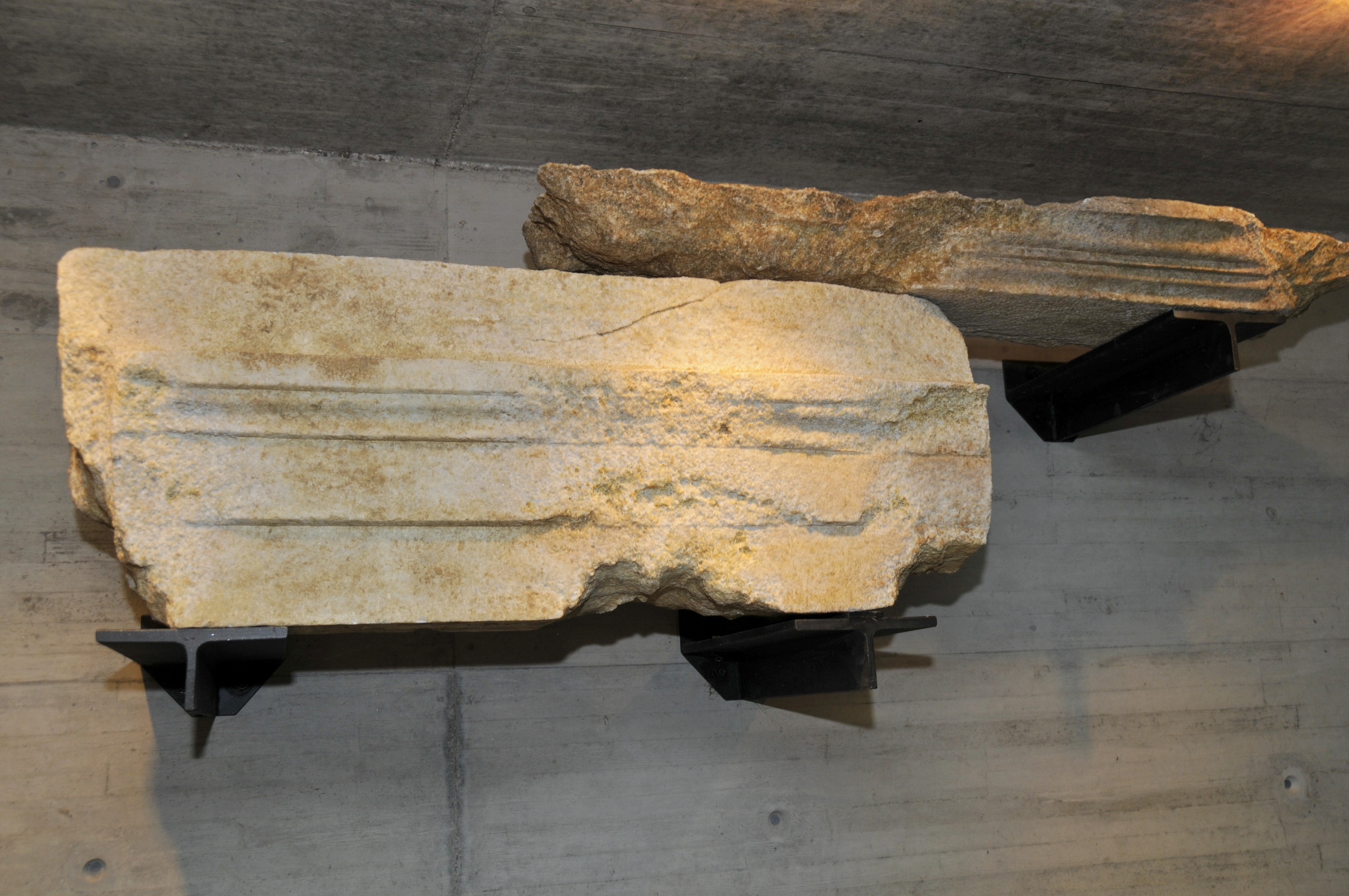
Remains of a tablet of the temple

== Politics ==
In the 2007 federal election the most popular party was the FDP which received 28.66% of the vote. The next three most popular parties were the CVP (25.5%), the Ticino League (15.99%) and the SP (14.4%). In the federal election, a total of 727 votes were cast, and the voter turnout was 47.4%.

In the 2007 Gran Consiglio election, there were a total of 1,520 registered voters in Bioggio, of which 997 or 65.6% voted. 14 blank ballots and 4 null ballots were cast, leaving 979 valid ballots in the election. The most popular party was the PLRT which received 267 or 27.3% of the vote. The next three most popular parties were; the PPD+GenGiova (with 189 or 19.3%), the SSI (with 159 or 16.2%) and the LEGA (with 137 or 14.0%).

In the 2007 Consiglio di Stato election, 9 blank ballots and 8 null ballots were cast, leaving 979 valid ballots in the election. The most popular party was the PLRT which received 244 or 24.9% of the vote. The next three most popular parties were; the LEGA (with 210 or 21.5%), the PPD (with 179 or 18.3%) and the SSI (with 153 or 15.6%).

== Economy ==
As of 2007, Bioggio had an unemployment rate of 2.76%. As of 2005, there were 23 people employed in the primary economic sector and about 8 businesses involved in this sector. 1,482 people were employed in the secondary sector and there were 58 businesses in this sector. 1,340 people were employed in the tertiary sector, with 123 businesses in this sector. There were 738 residents of the municipality who were employed in some capacity, of which females made up 43.5% of the workforce.

In 2000, there were 3,276 workers who commuted into the municipality and 537 workers who commuted away. The municipality is a net importer of workers, with about 6.1 workers entering the municipality for every one leaving. About 24.8% of the workforce coming into Bioggio are coming from outside Switzerland. Of the working population, 11.1% used public transportation to get to work, and 63% used a private car.

As of 2009, there was one hotel in Bioggio.

Darwin Airline has its headquarters in Bioggio.

== Religion ==
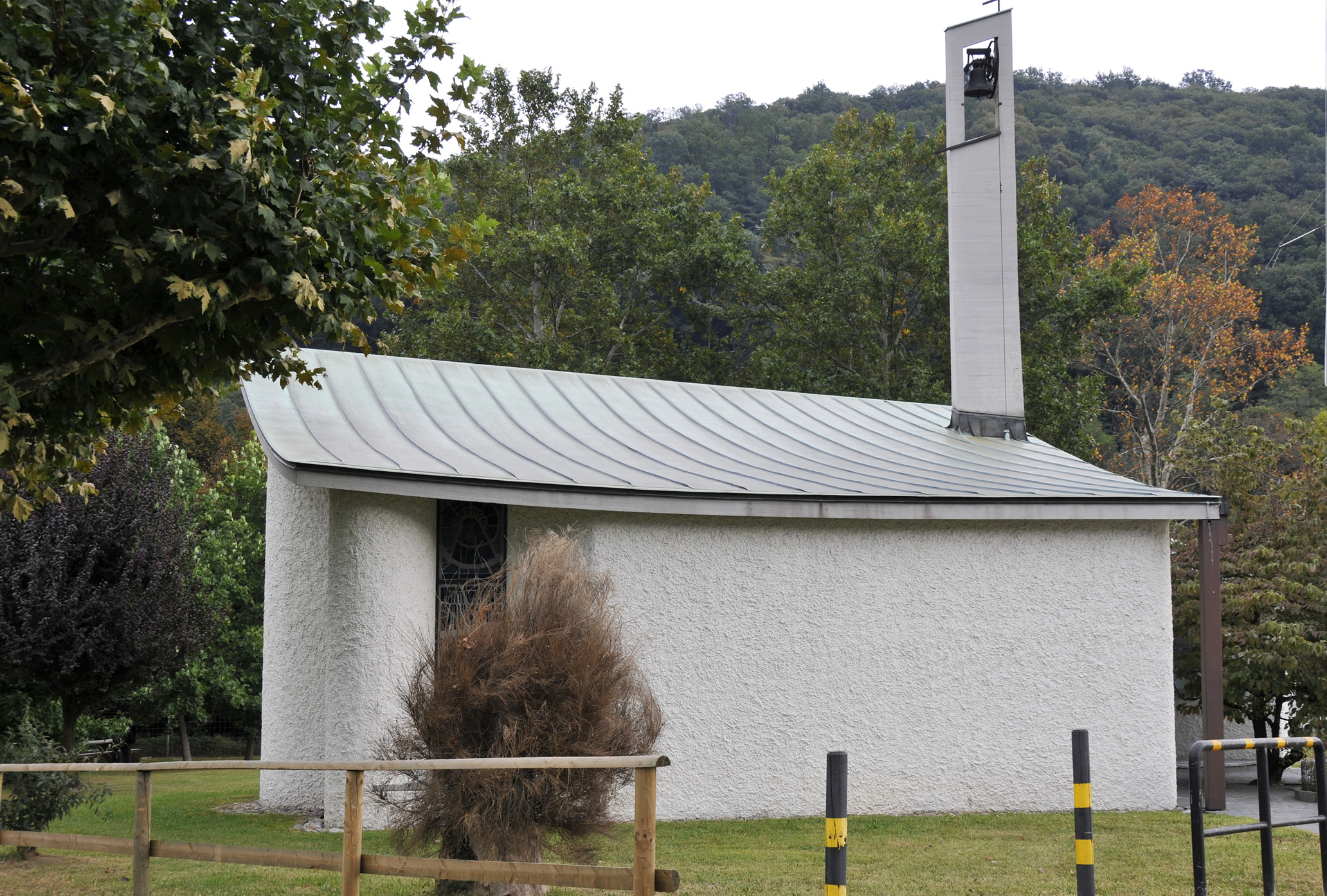
Church in Bioggio

From the 2000 census, 1,215 or 80.8% were Roman Catholic, while 119 or 7.9% belonged to the Swiss Reformed Church. There are 128 individuals (or about 8.51% of the population) who belong to another church (not listed on the census), and 42 individuals (or about 2.79% of the population) did not answer the question.

== Education ==
The entire Swiss population is generally well educated. In Bioggio about 77.6% of the population (between age 25 and 64) have completed either non-mandatory upper secondary education or additional higher education (either university or a Fachhochschule).

In Bioggio there were a total of 402 students (as of 2009). The Ticino education system provides up to three years of non-mandatory kindergarten and in Bioggio there were 72 children in kindergarten. The primary school program lasts for five years and includes both a standard school and a special school. In the municipality, 106 students attended the standard primary schools and 3 students attended the special school. In the lower secondary school system, students either attend a two-year middle school followed by a two-year pre-apprenticeship or they attend a four-year program to prepare for higher education. There were 92 students in the two-year middle school and 2 in their pre-apprenticeship, while 55 students were in the four-year advanced program.

The upper secondary school includes several options, but at the end of the upper secondary program, a student will be prepared to enter a trade or to continue on to a university or college. In Ticino, vocational students may either attend school while working on their internship or apprenticeship (which takes three or four years) or may attend school followed by an internship or apprenticeship (which takes one year as a full-time student or one and a half to two years as a part-time student). There were 27 vocational students who were attending school full-time and 42 who attend part-time.

The professional program lasts three years and prepares a student for a job in engineering, nursing, computer science, business, tourism and similar fields. There were 3 students in the professional program.

As of 2000, there were 75 students in Bioggio who came from another municipality, while 143 residents attended schools outside the municipality.

== Transport ==
Bioggio is served by Bioggio station and Bioggio Molinazzo station, both of which are on the metre gauge Lugano–Ponte Tresa railway that connects to Lugano. The stations are served by regular trains, operating every 15 minutes during weekday daytime, and every half-hour at other times. Bioggio is also served by buses of the Autopostale.
