= Leveille =

Leveille is a surname. Notable people with the name include:

- Charles Leveille (born 1983), an American speed skater
- Daultan Leveille (born 1990), a Canadian NCAA ice hockey player
- Kevin Leveille (born 1981), an American lacrosse player
- Lise Leveille (born 1982), a French Canadian gymnast
- Mike Leveille (born 1985), a professional lacrosse player
- Normand Leveille (born 1963), a retired Canadian professional hockey player

== See also ==
- Léveillé
