= Vernate, Ticino =

Vernate
- Municipality
- Flag Coat of arms
- Location of Vernate
- Location within Switzerland Location within Canton of Ticino
- Coordinates: 46°0′N 8°53′E
- Country: Switzerland
- Canton: Ticino
- District: Lugano

Government
  - Mayor: Sindaco

Area
  - Total: 1.51 km^{2} (0.58 sq mi)
- Elevation: 546 m (1,791 ft)

Population (December 2004)
  - Total: 435
  - Density: 288/km^{2} (746/sq mi)
- Time zone: UTC+01:00 (CET)
  - Summer (DST): UTC+02:00 (CEST)
- Postal code: 6992
- SFOS number: 5230
- ISO 3166 code: CH-TI
- Surrounded by: Agno, Bioggio, Curio, Iseo, Neggio
- Website: http://www.vernate.ch SFSO statistics

Vernate is a municipality in the district of Lugano in the canton of Ticino in Switzerland.

== Geography ==
Vernate has an area, as of 1997, of 1.51 square kilometers (0.58 sq mi). Of this area, 0.23 km^{2} (0.089 sq mi) or 15.2% is used for agricultural purposes, while 1.25 km^{2} (0.48 sq mi) or 82.8% is forested. Of the rest of the land, 0.19 km^{2} (0.073 sq mi) or 12.6% is settled (buildings or roads).

Of the built up area, housing and buildings made up 10.6% and transportation infrastructure made up 1.3%. Out of the forested land, 76.8% of the total land area is heavily forested and 6.0% is covered with orchards or small clusters of trees. Of the agricultural land, 2.6% is used for growing crops, while 2.0% is used for orchards or vine crops and 10.6% is used for alpine pastures.

== Coat of arms ==
The blazon of the municipal coat of arms is Azure a fess argent and overall in dexter an arrow point to base and in sinister a walking stick handle to chief both counterchanged. The arrow and pilgrim stick are attributes of St. Roch (Rocco) and St. Sebastian (Sebastiano) the patron saints of the parish church.

== Demographics ==
Vernate has a population (as of December 2020) of 599. As of 2008, 16.4% of the population are resident foreign nationals. Over the last 10 years (1997–2007) the population has changed at a rate of 47.3%.

Most of the population (as of 2000) speaks Italian (73.6%), with German being second most common (19.3%) and French being third (2.2%). Of the Swiss national languages (as of 2000), 70 speak German, 8 people speak French, 267 people speak Italian, and 1 person speaks Romansh. The remainder (17 people) speak another language.

As of 2008, the gender distribution of the population was 50.9% male and 49.1% female. The population was made up of 229 Swiss men (40.9% of the population), and 56 (10.0%) non-Swiss men. There were 227 Swiss women (40.5%), and 48 (8.6%) non-Swiss women.

In 2008 there were 5 live births to Swiss citizens and 1 birth to non-Swiss citizens, and in same time span there was 1 death of a Swiss citizen. Ignoring immigration and emigration, the population of Swiss citizens increased by 4 while the foreign population increased by 1. There was 1 Swiss woman who immigrated back to Switzerland. At the same time, there were 3 non-Swiss men and 1 non-Swiss woman who immigrated from another country to Switzerland. The total Swiss population change in 2008 (from all sources, including moves across municipal borders) was an increase of 25 and the non-Swiss population change was an increase of 6 people. This represents a population growth rate of 6.3%.

The age distribution, as of 2009, in Vernate is; 68 children or 12.1% of the population are between 0 and 9 years old and 55 teenagers or 9.8% are between 10 and 19. Of the adult population, 41 people or 7.3% of the population are between 20 and 29 years old. 81 people or 14.5% are between 30 and 39, 117 people or 20.9% are between 40 and 49, and 82 people or 14.6% are between 50 and 59. The senior population distribution is 59 people or 10.5% of the population are between 60 and 69 years old, 39 people or 7.0% are between 70 and 79, there are 18 people or 3.2% who are over 80.

As of 2000, there were 172 private households in the municipality, and an average of 2.1 persons per household. In 2000 there were 180 single family homes (or 83.7% of the total) out of a total of 215 inhabited buildings. There were 22 two family buildings (10.2%) and 10 multi-family buildings (4.7%). There were also 3 buildings in the municipality that were multipurpose buildings (used for both housing and commercial or another purpose).

The vacancy rate for the municipality, in 2008, was 0%. In 2000 there were 281 apartments in the municipality. The most common apartment size was the 5 room apartment of which there were 100. There were 7 single room apartments and 100 apartments with five or more rooms. Of these apartments, a total of 171 apartments (60.9% of the total) were permanently occupied, while 108 apartments (38.4%) were seasonally occupied and 2 apartments (0.7%) were empty. As of 2007, the construction rate of new housing units was 36.6 new units per 1000 residents.

The historical population is given in the following chart:

== Politics ==
In the 2007 federal election the most popular party was the FDP which received 29.58% of the vote. The next three most popular parties were the CVP (20.59%), the SVP (17.19%) and the SP (15.79%). In the federal election, a total of 151 votes were cast, and the voter turnout was 49.2%.

In the 2007 Gran Consiglio election, there were a total of 301 registered voters in Vernate, of which 191 or 63.5% voted. 3 blank ballots were cast, leaving 188 valid ballots in the election. The most popular party was the PLRT which received 56 or 29.8% of the vote. The next three most popular parties were; the SSI (with 38 or 20.2%), the PPD+GenGiova (with 32 or 17.0%) and the PS (with 20 or 10.6%).

In the 2007 Consiglio di Stato election, 4 blank ballots were cast, leaving 187 valid ballots in the election. The most popular party was the PLRT which received 59 or 31.6% of the vote. The next three most popular parties were; the SSI (with 34 or 18.2%), the PPD (with 29 or 15.5%) and the PS (with 28 or 15.0%).

== Economy ==
As of 2007, Vernate had an unemployment rate of 5.16%. As of 2005, there were people employed in the primary economic sector and about businesses involved in this sector. 24 people were employed in the secondary sector and there were 5 businesses in this sector. 25 people were employed in the tertiary sector, with 13 businesses in this sector. There were 175 residents of the municipality who were employed in some capacity, of which females made up 41.1% of the workforce.

In 2000, there were 27 workers who commuted into the municipality and 138 workers who commuted away. The municipality is a net exporter of workers, with about 5.1 workers leaving the municipality for every one entering. About 22.2% of the workforce coming into Vernate are coming from outside Switzerland. Of the working population, 4.6% used public transportation to get to work, and 73.1% used a private car.

== Religion ==
From the 2000 census, 248 or 68.3% were Roman Catholic, while 49 or 13.5% belonged to the Swiss Reformed Church. There are 57 individuals (or about 15.70% of the population) who belong to another church (not listed on the census), and 9 individuals (or about 2.48% of the population) did not answer the question.

== Education ==
In Vernate about 80.2% of the population (between age 25-64) have completed either non-mandatory upper secondary education or additional higher education (either university or a Fachhochschule).

In Vernate there were a total of 97 students (as of 2009). The Ticino education system provides up to three years of non-mandatory kindergarten and in Vernate there were 24 children in kindergarten. The primary school program lasts for five years. In the municipality, 32 students attended the standard primary schools. In the lower secondary school system, students either attend a two-year middle school followed by a two-year pre-apprenticeship or they attend a four-year program to prepare for higher education. There were 18 students in the two-year middle school, while 9 students were in the four-year advanced program.

The upper secondary school includes several options, but at the end of the upper secondary program, a student will be prepared to enter a trade or to continue on to a university or college. In Ticino, vocational students may either attend school while working on their internship or apprenticeship (which takes three or four years) or may attend school followed by an internship or apprenticeship (which takes one year as a full-time student or one and a half to two years as a part-time student). There were 4 vocational students who were attending school full-time and 9 who attend part-time.

The professional program lasts three years and prepares a student for a job in engineering, nursing, computer science, business, tourism and similar fields. There was 1 student in the professional program.

As of 2000, there was 1 student in Vernate who came from another municipality, while 46 residents attended schools outside the municipality.
