= Philippe Léveillé =

French-born Italian chef, born 1963

Philippe Léveillé (born 27 July 1963) is a French-born chef and television personality based in Italy. He is the chef and co-owner of the Michelin-starred restaurant Miramonti l'Altro in Concesio, near Brescia. Léveillé was also the consulting chef and co-owner of the Michelin-starred restaurant L'Altro in Hong Kong. He has taken part in charitable and humanitarian activities, including initiatives held by the Red Cross.

== Early life and training ==
Léveillé was born in Nantes, France, on 27 July 1963. His father worked as an oyster farmer in Cancale, Brittany. Léveillé began his culinary training in 1976, when he enrolled at the hotel school in Saumur.

Léveillé apprenticed in Nantes under chef Bery. After completing his studies, he moved to Paris, where he worked as a commis at Lucas Carton, then a three-Michelin-starred restaurant led by Alain Senderens. He later worked with Georges Blanc in Vonnas.

== Career ==
In 1981 and 1982, Léveillé carried out humanitarian work with the Red Cross in Djibouti, Somalia, Ethiopia and Yemen.

After returning to Europe, he worked in several restaurants and hotel kitchens, including in Paris, at the Hilton hotel restaurant at John F. Kennedy International Airport in New York, in Corsica, in the Caribbean and South America, and in Roquebrune-Cap-Martin near Monaco.

Léveillé moved to Italy in December 1987. He first worked with chef Vittorio Fusari at Le Maschere in Iseo, which received a Michelin star during that period. He later worked at Ponte di Briolo in Valbrembo before joining Miramonti, the Piscini family’s restaurant, in 1992.

In 2017, Léveillé taught classes on Italian risotto in Lyon and Paris, including at the Institut Paul Bocuse and École Grégoire-Ferrandi.

== Restaurants ==
In 1992, Léveillé joined Miramonti, then located in Caino and run by the Piscini family. In 1994, the restaurant moved to Concesio and was renamed Miramonti l'Altro. His cooking at the restaurant has been described as combining French culinary technique with Italian gastronomic traditions. Léveillé works alongside his wife Daniela Piscini, who serves as maître d'hôtel.

In 2012, Léveillé opened L'altro in Hong Kong, an Italian restaurant linked to Miramonti l'Altro. He continued to provide culinary guidance until April 2017.

== Awards and recognition ==
=== Miramonti l'Altro ===
- Unique Red Crown - Best Italian Restaurant (2027), Il Golosario.
- Michelin star (2026, 2027), Michelin Guide.
- Three Forks (2018-2027), the highest rating in the Gambero Rosso restaurant guide.
- Four Hats (2026), Le Guide de L'Espresso.
- Two Michelin stars (2001-2025), Michelin Guide.
- Diploma of Excellent Cuisine (2024), Italian Academy of Cuisine.
- Included by National Geographic Traveller among Europe's best gourmet getaways (2023).
- Golden Hat (2018-2022), L'Espresso restaurant guide, awarded to Miramonti l'Altro as one of the best restaurants in Italy.
- Maître of the Year (2021), Le Guide de L'Espresso, awarded to Daniela Piscini of Miramonti l'Altro.

=== L'altro, Hong Kong ===
- Michelin star (2013, 2014), Michelin Guide.

== Television ==
Year	Programme	Channel	Role
2014	MasterChef Italia	Sky Uno	Guest judge
2014	The Chef	La5	Judge
2015	The Cooking Show	Rai 3	Guest
2015	Pechino Express	Rai 2	Contestant, with Ciccio Sultano as "Gli Stellati"
2017	Chopped Italia	Food Network	Judge
2018	Il ristorante degli chef	Rai 2	Judge

== Published works ==
- Léveillé, Philippe (2015). La mia vita al burro (in Italian). Florence and Milan: Giunti Editore. ISBN 9788809809734.
- Camanini, Riccardo; Léveillé, Philippe; Massari, Iginio (2016). Segni di stelle. Percorsi culinari in Valle Camonica (in Italian). Roccafranca: La Compagnia della Stampa. ISBN 9788884867155.
