= Iseo-myeon =

Iseo-myeon can refer to three different myeon in South Korea:

- Iseo-myeon, Cheongdo County, in Cheongdo County, North Gyeongsang Province
- Iseo-myeon, Wanju County, in Wanju County, North Jeolla Province
- Iseo-myeon, Hwasun County, in Hwasun County, South Jeolla Province
