= Mathieu Léveillé =

Canadian executioner

Mathieu Léveillé (1709 – September 9, 1743) was an executioner in New France, who was an enslaved person of African descent. For 24 years, had been enslaved and forced to work on a plantation in Martinique. According to some accounts, he repeatedly tried to escape, and was sentenced to death after his third attempt. His death sentence was commuted, and he was instead condemned to carry out death sentences, as a hangman in the French colony of New France. He was purchased for the purpose by the government of New France for 800 livres.

This was a fairly common practice. White settlers did not want the job, and enslaved Black people were frequently forced to become executioners, and carry out executions and other forms of corporal punishment and torture in New France during the 18th century. Léveillé may have been the executioner of Marie-Joseph Angelique (c. 1709-1734), an enslaved Black woman who set fire to the Quebec City home of the person who enslaved her, to cover an escape attempt. The fire spread and burnt 46 buildings, and when Marie-Joseph Angelique was recaptured she was tortured and sentenced to a death, which Léveillé may have carried out.

Léveillé was forced to serve as executioner from 1733 until his death.
