= Iseo, Switzerland =

Iseo
- Former municipality
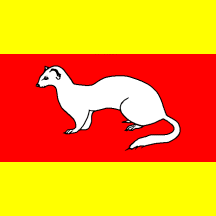
- Flag Coat of arms
- Location of Iseo
- Location within Switzerland Location within Canton of Ticino
- Coordinates: 46°00′N 8°53′E
- Country: Switzerland
- Canton: Ticino
- District: Lugano

Area
  - Total: 1.00 km^{2} (0.39 sq mi)
- Elevation: 684 m (2,244 ft)

Population (December 2004)
  - Total: 73
  - Density: 73/km^{2} (190/sq mi)
- Time zone: UTC+01:00 (CET)
  - Summer (DST): UTC+02:00 (CEST)
- Postal code: 6993
- SFOS number: 5188
- ISO 3166 code: CH-TI
- Surrounded by: Aranno, Bioggio, Cademario, Curio, Vernate
- Website: SFSO statistics

Iseo was a municipality in the district of Lugano in the canton of Ticino in Switzerland. It was incorporated into the comune of Bioggio in 2008.

Aerial view (1966)
