= Aranno =

- Municipality
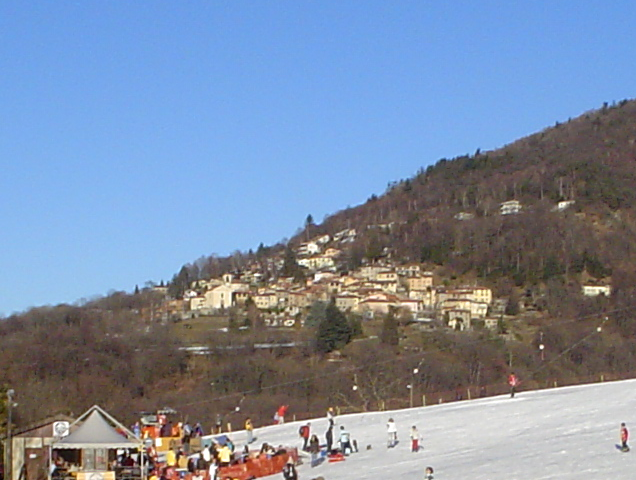

- Flag Coat of arms
- Location of Aranno
- Location within Switzerland Location within Canton of Ticino
- Coordinates: 46°1′N 8°52′E
- Country: Switzerland
- Canton: Ticino
- District: Lugano

Government
  - Mayor: Sindaco

Area
  - Total: 2.72 km^{2} (1.05 sq mi)
- Elevation: 707 m (2,320 ft)

Population (December 2002)
  - Total: 284
  - Density: 104/km^{2} (270/sq mi)
- Time zone: UTC+01:00 (CET)
  - Summer (DST): UTC+02:00 (CEST)
- Postal code: 6994
- SFOS number: 5143
- ISO 3166 code: CH-TI
- Surrounded by: Alto Malcantone, Bioggio, Cademario, Curio, Iseo, Miglieglia, Novaggio
- Website: www.aranno.ch

Aranno is a municipality in the district of Lugano in the canton of Ticino in southern Switzerland. Bordering municipalities are Cademario, Iseo, Alto Malcantone, Miglieglia and Novaggio.

In Aranno you can find the "Maglio", the last power hammer of Switzerland. It stopped its activities in 1952.

== History ==
Aranno is first mentioned in 1335 as Arano.

Cemented into the facade of the Casa Pelli, there are four copies of grave stone fragments (discovered in 1842, originals in the Museo del Malcantone in Curio) with inscriptions in the so-called Alphabet of Lugano.

One unconfirmed source states that the parish church of San Vittore was built in the 17th century on the ruins of an ancient castle. The church was rebuilt in 1815 to its present appearance. Inside the church there are many artistic works from the Malcantone valley.

The local economy was based on agriculture and emigration to other countries for jobs. Further up the valley, there are numerous terraces that support intensive cultivation of vineyards and grain. In 1857, sphalerite, barite and stibnite were discovered and mined for several decades. On the right flank in the area of Miglieglia is the so-called Maglio power hammer. It was built in 1860 in Aranno and is the only functional power hammer with a lever device in Switzerland. It was bought by a preservation society and renovated.

== Geography ==
Aranno has an area, as of 1997, of 2.72 square kilometers (1.05 sq mi). Of this area, 0.15 km^{2} (0.058 sq mi) or 5.5% is used for agricultural purposes, while 2.3 km^{2} (0.89 sq mi) or 84.6% is forested. Of the rest of the land, 0.16 km^{2} (0.062 sq mi) or 5.9% is settled (buildings or roads), 0.06 km^{2} (15 acres) or 2.2% is either rivers or lakes and 0.01 km^{2} (2.5 acres) or 0.4% is unproductive land.

Of the built up area, housing and buildings made up 3.7% and transportation infrastructure made up 1.8%. Out of the forested land, 82.7% of the total land area is heavily forested and 1.8% is covered with orchards or small clusters of trees. Of the agricultural land, 1.5% is used for growing crops and 3.7% is used for alpine pastures. All the water in the municipality is flowing water.

The municipality is located in the Lugano district, in the Magliasina Valley at an elevation of 727 m (2,385 ft).

== Coat of arms ==
The blazon of the municipal coat of arms is Argent a plough gules and in a chief of the same a lion passant or. The plow may be a form of canting arms. The village name may have come from the Latin ara or altar. But in common usage this origin has been changed to the Italian arare or to plow, leading to the plow on the coat of arms.

== Demographics ==
Aranno has a population (as of December 2020) of 354. As of 2008, 12.6% of the population are resident foreign nationals. Over the last 10 years (1997–2007) the population has changed at a rate of 27.3%.

Most of the population (as of 2000) speaks Italian (79.4%), with German being second most common (16.1%) and French being third (1.9%). Of the Swiss national languages (as of 2000), 43 speak German, 5 people speak French, 212 people speak Italian, and 1 person speaks Romansh. The remainder (6 people) speak another language.

As of 2008, the gender distribution of the population was 46.9% male and 53.1% female. The population was made up of 130 Swiss men (40.9% of the population), and 19 (6.0%) non-Swiss men. There were 148 Swiss women (46.5%), and 21 (6.6%) non-Swiss women.

In 2008 there were 6 live births to Swiss citizens and were 2 deaths of Swiss citizens. Ignoring immigration and emigration, the population of Swiss citizens increased by 4 while the foreign population remained the same. There was 1 Swiss woman who emigrated from Switzerland and 1 non-Swiss woman who immigrated from another country to Switzerland. The total Swiss population change in 2008 (from all sources, including moves across municipal borders) was an increase of 1 and the non-Swiss population change was a decrease of 1 people. This represents a population growth rate of 0.0%.

The age distribution, as of 2009, in Aranno is; 36 children or 11.3% of the population are between 0 and 9 years old and 34 teenagers or 10.7% are between 10 and 19. Of the adult population, 29 people or 9.1% of the population are between 20 and 29 years old. 40 people or 12.6% are between 30 and 39, 69 people or 21.7% are between 40 and 49, and 39 people or 12.3% are between 50 and 59. The senior population distribution is 41 people or 12.9% of the population are between 60 and 69 years old, 21 people or 6.6% are between 70 and 79, there are 9 people or 2.8% who are over 80.

As of 2000, there were 115 private households in the municipality, and an average of 2.3 persons per household. In 2000 there were 131 single family homes (or 84.0% of the total) out of a total of 156 inhabited buildings. There were 17 two family buildings (10.9%) and 3 multi-family buildings (1.9%). There were also 5 buildings in the municipality that were multipurpose buildings (used for both housing and commercial or another purpose).

The vacancy rate for the municipality, in 2008, was 0.52%. In 2000 there were 179 apartments in the municipality. The most common apartment size was the 5 room apartment of which there were 75. There were 12 single room apartments and 75 apartments with five or more rooms. Of these apartments, a total of 114 apartments (63.7% of the total) were permanently occupied, while 63 apartments (35.2%) were seasonally occupied and 2 apartments (1.1%) were empty. As of 2007, the construction rate of new housing units was 3.1 new units per 1000 residents.

The historical population is given in the following table:

| year | population |
|---|---|
| 1599 | 269 |
| 1801 | 356 |
| 1850 | 268 |
| 1900 | 261 |
| 1950 | 183 |
| 1960 | 142 |
| 2000 | 267 |

== Sights ==
The entire village of Aranno is designated as part of the Inventory of Swiss Heritage Sites.

== Politics ==
In the 2007 federal election the most popular party was the SP which received 26.32% of the vote. The next three most popular parties were the FDP (23.01%), the CVP (20.32%) and the SVP (10.65%). In the federal election, a total of 106 votes were cast, and the voter turnout was 46.3%.

In the 2007 Gran Consiglio election, there were a total of 218 registered voters in Aranno, of which 146 or 67.0% voted. 5 blank ballots were cast, leaving 141 valid ballots in the election. The most popular party was the PS which received 32 or 22.7% of the vote. The next three most popular parties were; the PLRT (with 29 or 20.6%), the SSI (with 25 or 17.7%) and the PPD+GenGiova (with 23 or 16.3%).

In the 2007 Consiglio di Stato election, 1 blank ballot was cast, leaving 145 valid ballots in the election. The most popular party was the PS which received 34 or 23.4% of the vote. The next three most popular parties were; the LEGA (with 32 or 22.1%), the PPD (with 24 or 16.6%) and the SSI (with 23 or 15.9%).

== Economy ==
As of 2007, Aranno had an unemployment rate of 1.92%. As of 2005, there were 13 people employed in the primary economic sector and about 2 businesses involved in this sector. 4 people were employed in the secondary sector and there was 1 business in this sector. 11 people were employed in the tertiary sector, with 4 businesses in this sector. There were 124 residents of the municipality who were employed in some capacity, of which females made up 43.5% of the workforce.

In 2000, there were 12 workers who commuted into the municipality and 102 workers who commuted away. The municipality is a net exporter of workers, with about 8.5 workers leaving the municipality for every one entering. Of the working population, 11.3% used public transportation to get to work, and 72.6% used a private car.

== Religion ==
From the 2000 census, 179 or 67.0% were Roman Catholic, while 34 or 12.7% belonged to the Swiss Reformed Church. There are 43 individuals (or about 16.10% of the population) who belong to another church (not listed on the census), and 11 individuals (or about 4.12% of the population) did not answer the question.

== Education ==
The entire Swiss population is generally well educated. In Aranno about 84.1% of the population (between age 25 and 64) have completed either non-mandatory upper secondary education or additional higher education (either university or a Fachhochschule).

In Aranno there were a total of 62 students (as of 2009). The Ticino education system provides up to three years of non-mandatory kindergarten and in Aranno there were 7 children in kindergarten. The primary school program lasts for five years. In the municipality, 24 students attended the standard primary schools. In the lower secondary school system, students either attend a two-year middle school followed by a two-year pre-apprenticeship or they attend a four-year program to prepare for higher education. There were 14 students in the two-year middle school, while 7 students were in the four-year advanced program.

The upper secondary school includes several options, but at the end of the upper secondary program, a student will be prepared to enter a trade or to continue on to a university or college. In Ticino, vocational students may either attend school while working on their internship or apprenticeship (which takes three or four years) or may attend school followed by an internship or apprenticeship (which takes one year as a full-time student or one and a half to two years as a part-time student). There were 3 vocational students who were attending school full-time and 7 who attend part-time.

As of 2000, there were 44 students from Aranno who attended schools outside the municipality.
