= Cademario =

- Municipality
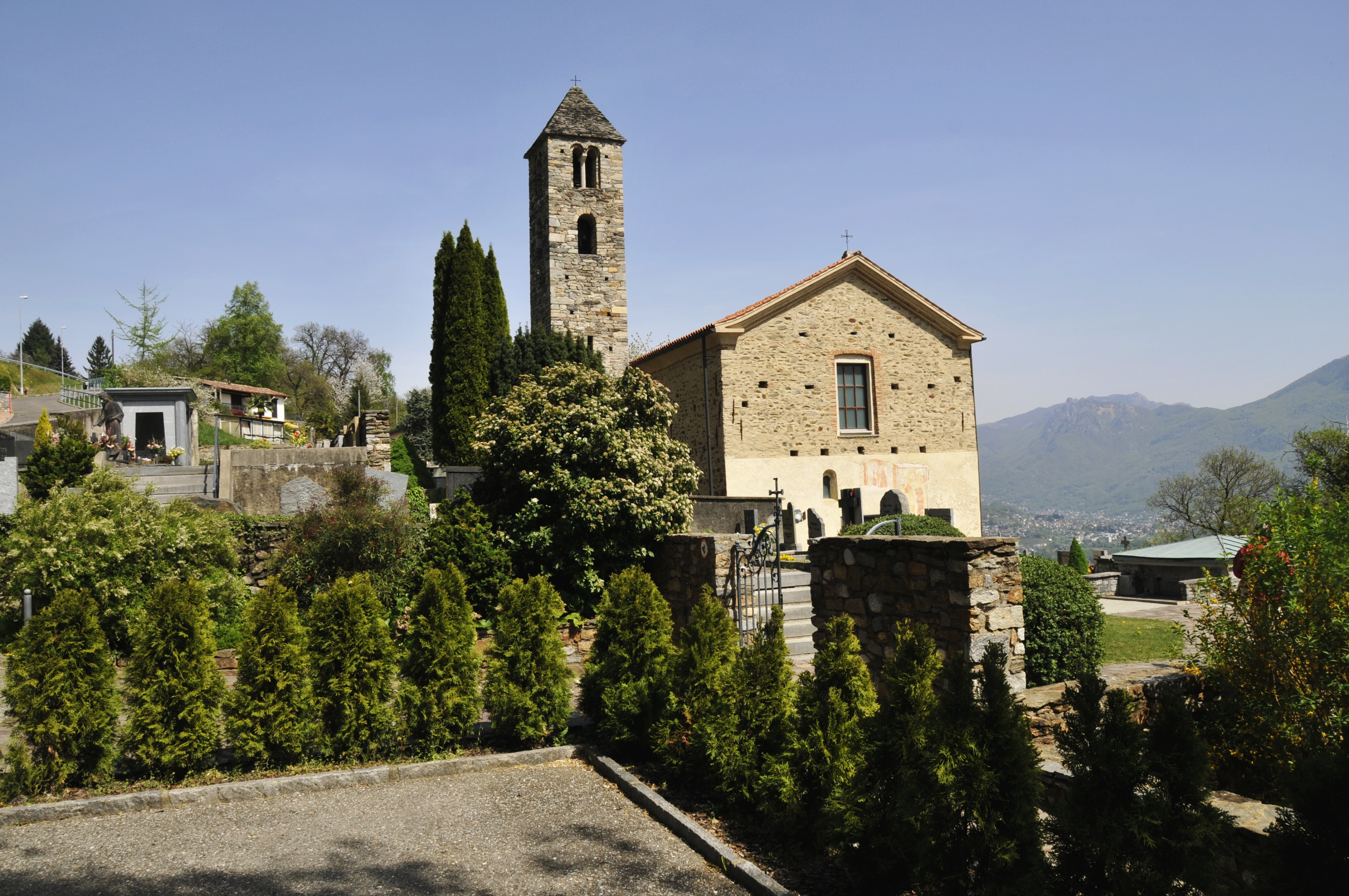
- Parish church of Sant'Ambrogio in Cademario

- Flag Coat of arms
- Location of Cademario
- Location within Switzerland Location within Canton of Ticino
- Coordinates: 46°1′N 8°54′E
- Country: Switzerland
- Canton: Ticino
- District: Lugano

Government
  - Mayor: Sindaco

Area
  - Total: 3.96 km^{2} (1.53 sq mi)
- Elevation: 792 m (2,598 ft)

Population (December 2002)
  - Total: 616
  - Density: 156/km^{2} (403/sq mi)
- Time zone: UTC+01:00 (CET)
  - Summer (DST): UTC+02:00 (CEST)
- Postal code: 6936
- SFOS number: 5161
- ISO 3166 code: CH-TI
- Surrounded by: Alto Malcantone, Aranno, Bioggio, Iseo
- Website: www.cademario.ch

Cademario is a municipality located in the district of Lugano in the Swiss canton of Ticino. Bordering municipalities are Aranno, Bioggio and Iseo, in the Alto Malcantone area.

== History ==
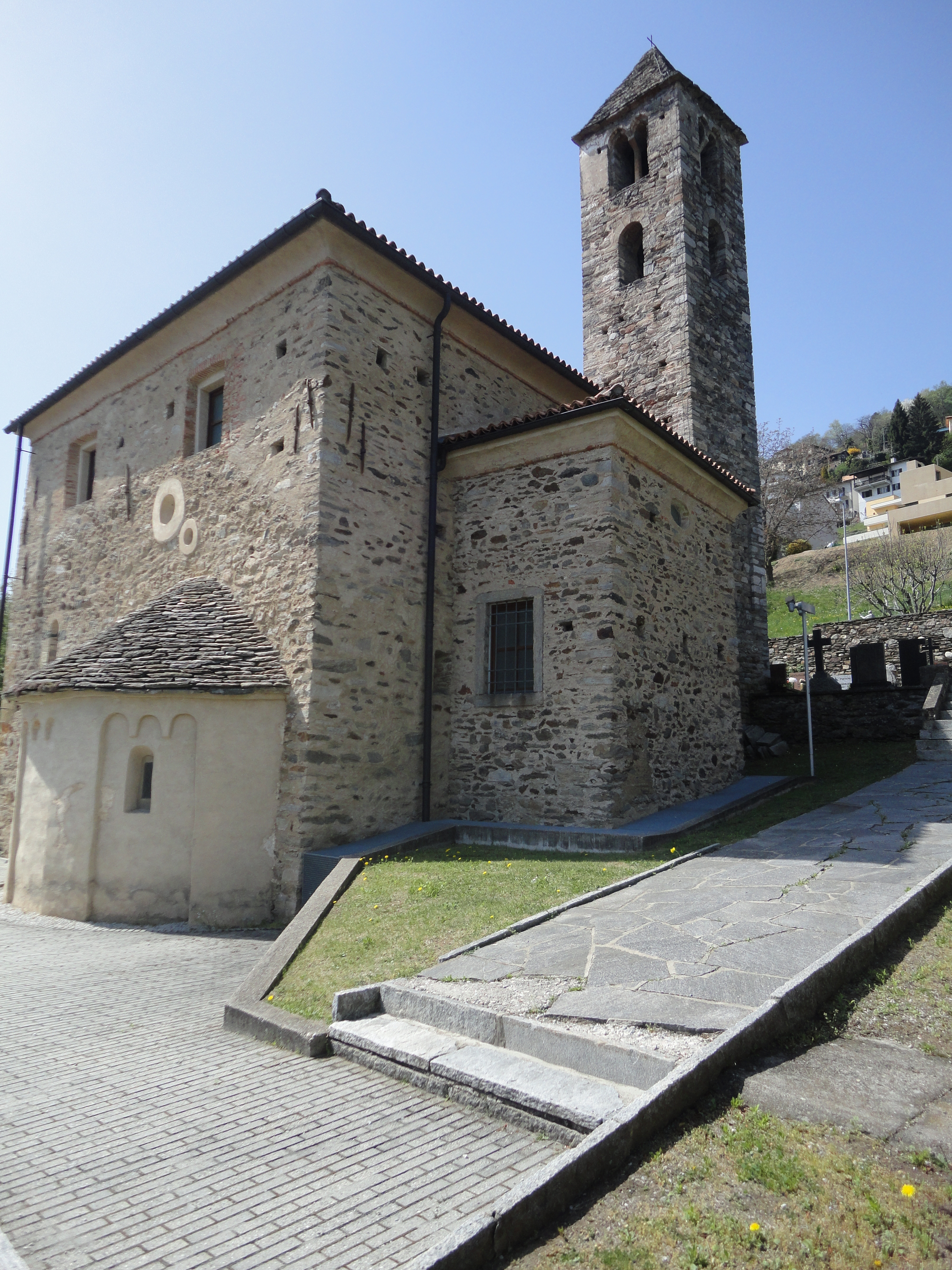
Parish church of Cademario

Cademario is first mentioned in 1163 as Cademerio. In 1335 it was mentioned as Cadelmario Superiore to distinguish it from Cadelmario Inferiore, which is now Bosco Luganese.

The oldest trace of a settlement in the area was an Iron Age cemetery which was discovered at La Forcora. By 1000 the Bishop of Como owned property and rights in the village. Later, some of these rights were transferred to the Benedictine Abbey of S. Abbondio in Como. Originally, the municipality was much larger. It included the villages of Bosco Luganese (now part of Bioggio), which separated in 1783, Bioggio and perhaps Gaggio.

The old parish church was built in the Early Middle Ages at a site below the village. Over the centuries the church was rebuilt numerous times. It was enlarged and rebuilt, new frescoes were added, and it was even re-aligned from the southeast to the north. The current building was built in the early 17th century, but it was also later enlarged. It was last consecrated in 1833. The parish archive contain a number of records from the Middle Ages, including town charters from 1416 and 1474.

Throughout its history, the slopes around the village were planted with vineyards. In 1990, the vineyards covered an area of 600 hectares (1,500 acres), with about 22,000 vines. There used to be a settlement at Alp Agra, but it was abandoned and all the buildings are gone. In the 1920s, the majestic Kurhaus or medicinal spa, was built above the village.

Aerial view (1948)

== Coat of arms ==
The coat of arms of Cademario represents on a red ground the seated figure of Saint Ambrose (to whom the village church is dedicated) in white pontificals with a gold halo and a gold cross on his mitre, carrying a gold crook and Bible marked with a black cross, and behind him a white scourge with black lashes.

== Geography ==
Cademario has an area, as of 1997, of 3.96 square kilometers (1.53 sq mi). Of this area, 0.63 km^{2} (0.24 sq mi) or 15.9% is used for agricultural purposes, while 3.1 km^{2} (1.2 sq mi) or 78.3% is forested. Of the rest of the land, 0.33 km^{2} (0.13 sq mi) or 8.3% is settled (buildings or roads) and 0.09 km^{2} (22 acres) or 2.3% is unproductive land.

Of the built up area, housing and buildings made up 6.1% and transportation infrastructure made up 2.0%. Out of the forested land, 75.3% of the total land area is heavily forested and 3.0% is covered with orchards or small clusters of trees. Of the agricultural land, 6.3% is used for growing crops, while 3.5% is used for orchards or vine crops and 6.1% is used for alpine pastures.

The municipality is located in the Lugano district, in the upper Malcantone valley. It consists of the village of Cademario and the hamlets of Renera and Bogno.

== Demographics ==
Cademario has a population (as of December 2020) of 761. As of 2008, 16.4% of the population are resident foreign nationals. Over the last 10 years (1997–2007) the population has changed at a rate of 19.9%.

Most of the population (as of 2000) speaks Italian (74.8%), with German being second most common (16.3%) and Portuguese being third (2.3%). Of the Swiss national languages (as of 2000), 97 speak German, 11 people speak French, 446 people speak Italian, and 1 person speaks Romansh. The remainder (41 people) speak another language.

As of 2008, the gender distribution of the population was 48.4% male and 51.6% female. The population was made up of 270 Swiss men (39.4% of the population), and 62 (9.0%) non-Swiss men. There were 301 Swiss women (43.9%), and 53 (7.7%) non-Swiss women.

In 2008 there were 14 live births to Swiss citizens and 2 births to non-Swiss citizens, and in same time span there were 5 deaths of Swiss citizens and 1 non-Swiss citizen death. Ignoring immigration and emigration, the population of Swiss citizens increased by 9 while the foreign population increased by 1. There were 4 Swiss men and 1 Swiss woman who immigrated back to Switzerland. At the same time, there were 4 non-Swiss men and 5 non-Swiss women who immigrated from another country to Switzerland. The total Swiss population change in 2008 (from all sources, including moves across municipal borders) was an increase of 12 and the non-Swiss population change was an increase of 2 people. This represents a population growth rate of 2.0%.

The age distribution, as of 2009, in Cademario is; 80 children or 11.7% of the population are between 0 and 9 years old and 68 teenagers or 9.9% are between 10 and 19. Of the adult population, 53 people or 7.7% of the population are between 20 and 29 years old. 90 people or 13.1% are between 30 and 39, 124 people or 18.1% are between 40 and 49, and 75 people or 10.9% are between 50 and 59. The senior population distribution is 91 people or 13.3% of the population are between 60 and 69 years old, 68 people or 9.9% are between 70 and 79, there are 37 people or 5.4% who are over 80.

As of 2000, there were 266 private households in the municipality, and an average of 2.2 persons per household. In 2000 there were 224 single family homes (or 72.3% of the total) out of a total of 310 inhabited buildings. There were 43 two family buildings (13.9%) and 27 multi-family buildings (8.7%). There were also 16 buildings in the municipality that were multipurpose buildings (used for both housing and commercial or another purpose).

The vacancy rate for the municipality, in 2008, was 0%. In 2000 there were 475 apartments in the municipality. The most common apartment size was the 3 room apartment of which there were 152. There were 43 single room apartments and 126 apartments with five or more rooms. Of these apartments, a total of 263 apartments (55.4% of the total) were permanently occupied, while 206 apartments (43.4%) were seasonally occupied and 6 apartments (1.3%) were empty. As of 2007, the construction rate of new housing units was 5.8 new units per 1000 residents.

The historical population is given in the following table:

year	population
1599	500
1696	370
1801	331
1900	347
1950	422
1990	474
2000	596

== Heritage sites of national significance ==
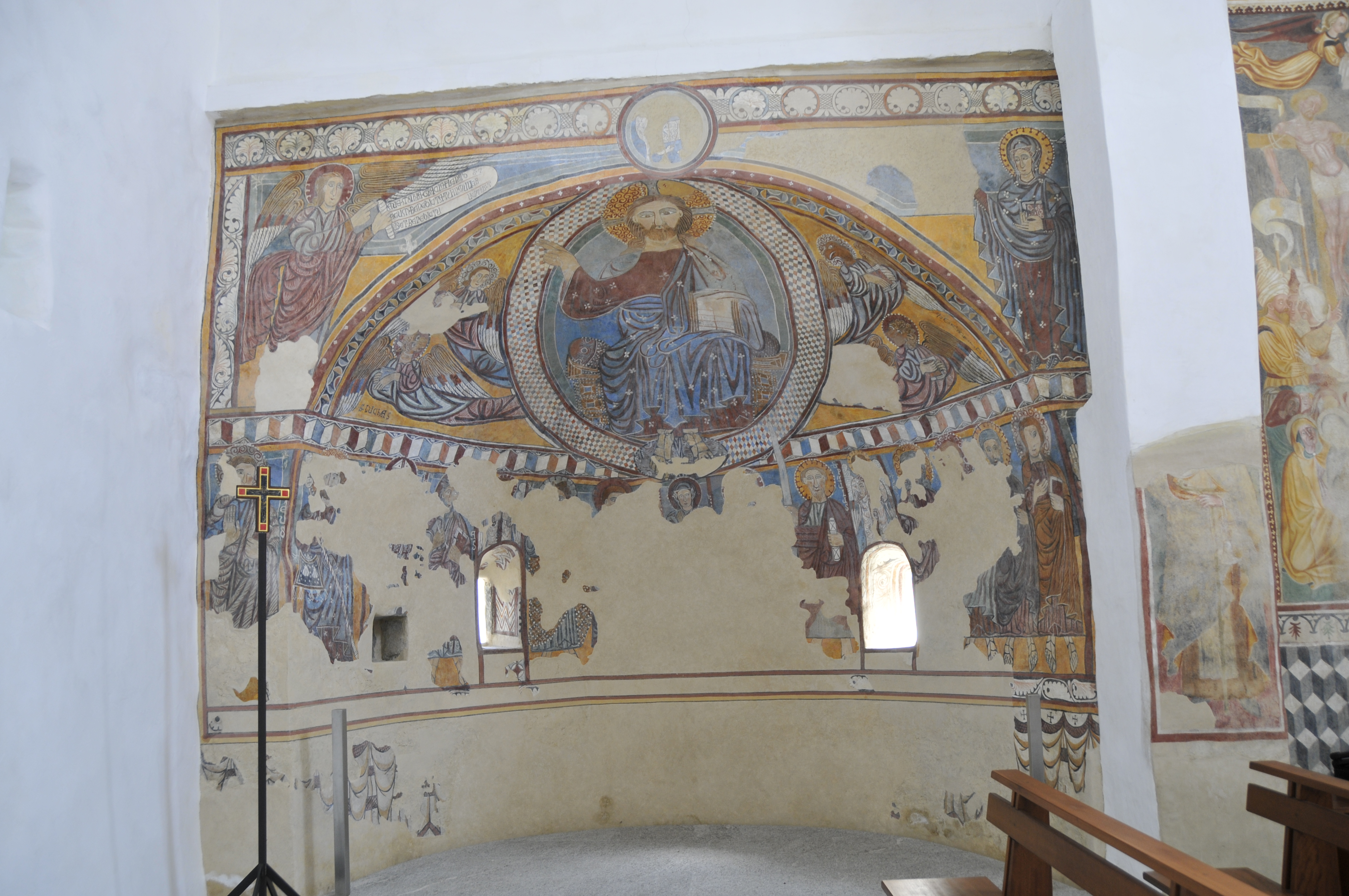
Fresco inside the parish church of S. Ambrogio

The Parish Church of S. Ambrogio and the Necropolis a Forcora are listed as Swiss heritage site of national significance.

== Politics ==
In the 2007 federal election the most popular party was the FDP which received 35.98% of the vote. The next three most popular parties were the CVP (15.25%), the SP (15.03%) and the SVP (12.95%). In the federal election, a total of 238 votes were cast, and the voter turnout was 48.0%.

In the 2007 Gran Consiglio election, there were a total of 480 registered voters in Cademario, of which 304 or 63.3% voted. 9 blank ballots and 1 null ballot were cast, leaving 294 valid ballots in the election. The most popular party was the PLRT which received 109 or 37.1% of the vote. The next three most popular parties were; the PS (with 55 or 18.7%), the LEGA (with 38 or 12.9%) and the PPD+GenGiova (with 32 or 10.9%).

In the 2007 Consiglio di Stato election, 5 blank ballots were cast, leaving 299 valid ballots in the election. The most popular party was the PLRT which received 109 or 36.5% of the vote. The next three most popular parties were; the LEGA (with 57 or 19.1%), the PS (with 56 or 18.7%) and the PPD (with 29 or 9.7%).

== Economy ==
As of 2007, Cademario had an unemployment rate of 4.59%. As of 2005, there were 23 people employed in the primary economic sector and about 8 businesses involved in this sector. 27 people were employed in the secondary sector and there were 3 businesses in this sector. 128 people were employed in the tertiary sector, with 19 businesses in this sector. There were 266 residents of the municipality who were employed in some capacity, of which females made up 42.1% of the workforce.

In 2000, there were 95 workers who commuted into the municipality and 180 workers who commuted away. The municipality is a net exporter of workers, with about 1.9 workers leaving the municipality for every one entering. About 17.9% of the workforce coming into Cademario are coming from outside Switzerland. Of the working population, 9.8% used public transportation to get to work, and 58.3% used a private car. As of 2009, there were 2 hotels in Cademario.

== Religion ==
From the 2000 census, 430 or 72.1% were Roman Catholic, while 79 or 13.3% belonged to the Swiss Reformed Church. There are 72 individuals (or about 12.08% of the population) who belong to another church (not listed on the census), and 15 individuals (or about 2.52% of the population) did not answer the question.

== Education ==
The entire Swiss population is generally well educated. In Cademario about 70.5% of the population (between age 25-64) have completed either non-mandatory upper secondary education or additional higher education (either University or a Fachhochschule).

In Cademario there were a total of 117 students (as of 2009). The Ticino education system provides up to three years of non-mandatory kindergarten and in Cademario there were 13 children in kindergarten. The primary school program lasts for five years. In the municipality, 47 students attended the standard primary schools. In the lower secondary school system, students either attend a two-year middle school followed by a two-year pre-apprenticeship or they attend a four-year program to prepare for higher education. There were 34 students in the two-year middle school, while 7 students were in the four-year advanced program.

The upper secondary school includes several options, but at the end of the upper secondary program, a student will be prepared to enter a trade or to continue on to a university or college. In Ticino, vocational students may either attend school while working on their internship or apprenticeship (which takes three or four years) or may attend school followed by an internship or apprenticeship (which takes one year as a full-time student or one and a half to two years as a part-time student). There were 7 vocational students who were attending school full-time and 7 who attend part-time.

The professional program lasts three years and prepares a student for a job in engineering, nursing, computer science, business, tourism and similar fields. There were 2 students in the professional program.

As of 2000, there were 73 students in Cademario who came from another municipality, while 56 residents attended schools outside the municipality.
