= Canobbio =

- Municipality
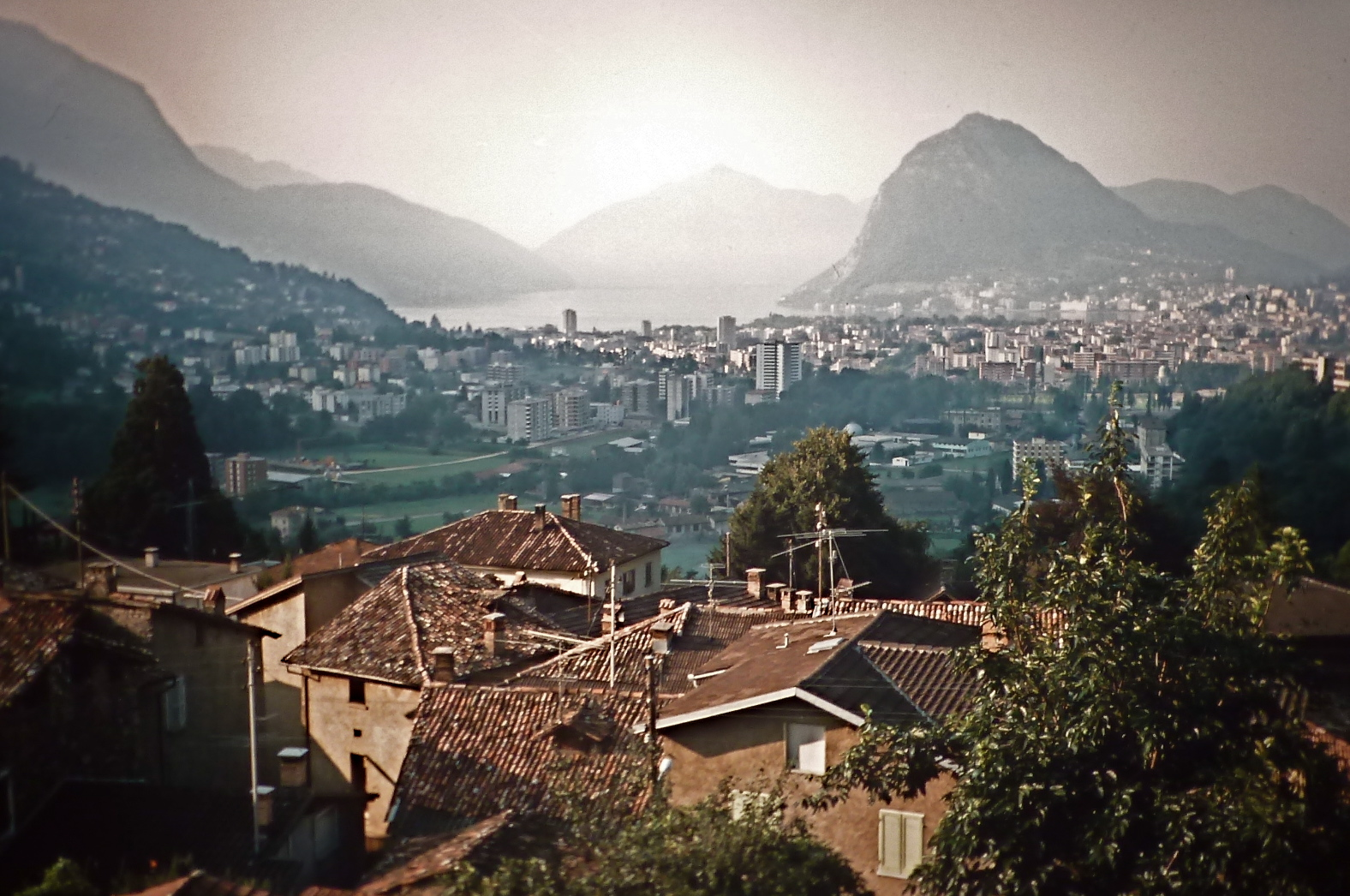

- Flag Coat of arms
- Location of Canobbio
- Location within Switzerland Location within Canton of Ticino
- Coordinates: 46°2′N 8°58′E
- Country: Switzerland
- Canton: Ticino
- District: Lugano

Government
  - Mayor: Sindaco

Area
  - Total: 1.3 km^{2} (0.50 sq mi)
- Elevation: 405 m (1,329 ft)

Population (December 2004)
  - Total: 1,799
  - Density: 1,400/km^{2} (3,600/sq mi)
- Time zone: UTC+01:00 (CET)
  - Summer (DST): UTC+02:00 (CEST)
- Postal code: 6952
- SFOS number: 5167
- ISO 3166 code: CH-TI
- Localities: Corba, Ganna, Maglio, Cartiera–Ponte di Valle
- Surrounded by: Cadro, Capriasca, Comano, Lugano, Porza
- Website: www.canobbio.ch

Canobbio is a municipality in the circolo Vezia of the district of Lugano in the canton of Ticino in Switzerland.

== History ==
Roman era inscription and cremation graves from the 3rd Century AD indicate that there was an earlier settlement near the modern village. Canobbio is first mentioned in 712 as Canobli. During the Middle Ages it was a farm of the Abbey of S. Ambrogio in Milan. The Church of S. Siro, is first mentioned 863. It belonged to the Abbey of San Pietro in Ciel d'Oro in Pavia. The settlement of Conago is first mentioned in 1335 along with its church of San Silvestro. The Humiliati monastery of S. Caterina in Lugano also owned land in Canobbio. In 1472 the village church in Canobbio separated from the mother church in Lugano (1472) and was incorporated in the parish of Comano. It became an independent parish in 1643.

In Canobbio there were two mills, the oldest was owned by the Pocobelli family (1712), and then by Fumagalli family. It was rebuilt in 1900 in brick. The younger mill was built in 1848, for the De Marchi family of Astano and later the Bernasconi from Chiasso. In 1870 the Baron Paul von Dervies, a Russian banker and railroad magnate built the Castello di Trevano as a temple to music, in the vicinity of Canobbio, with a private orchestra of 52 players. Between 1960 and 1990 the number of inhabitants doubled. The number of jobs in the services sector is increasing.

Canobbio is home to a district school and a popular shopping center.

Aerial view (1948)

== Geography ==
Canobbio has an area, as of 1997, of 1.3 square kilometers (0.50 sq mi). Of this area, 0.38 km^{2} (0.15 sq mi) or 29.2% is used for agricultural purposes, while 0.49 km^{2} (0.19 sq mi) or 37.7% is forested. Of the rest of the land, 0.66 km^{2} (0.25 sq mi) or 50.8% is settled (buildings or roads), 0.03 km^{2} (7.4 acres) or 2.3% is either rivers or lakes and 0.03 km^{2} (7.4 acres) or 2.3% is unproductive land.

Of the built up area, industrial buildings made up 6.9% of the total area while housing and buildings made up 22.3% and transportation infrastructure made up 11.5%. Power and water infrastructure as well as other special developed areas made up 8.5% of the area while parks, green belts and sports fields made up 1.5%. Out of the forested land, 32.3% of the total land area is heavily forested and 5.4% is covered with orchards or small clusters of trees. Of the agricultural land, 6.9% is used for growing crops and 22.3% is used for alpine pastures. All the water in the municipality is flowing water. Of the unproductive areas, 2.3% is unproductive vegetation and .

The municipality is located in the Lugano district, on a hill north of Lugano. It includes the village of Canobbio and the settlement of Conago.

== Coat of arms ==
The blazon of the municipal coat of arms is Gules a hemp plant argent seeded or.

== Demographics ==
Canobbio has a population (as of December 2020) of 2,302. As of 2008, 18.3% of the population are resident foreign nationals. Over the last 10 years (1997–2007) the population has changed at a rate of 4.3%.

Most of the population (as of 2000) speaks Italian (88.6%), with German being second most common (4.3%) and French being third (1.3%). Of the Swiss national languages (as of 2000), 78 speak German, 24 people speak French, 1,617 people speak Italian, and 4 people speak Romansh. The remainder (102 people) speak another language.

As of 2008, the gender distribution of the population was 48.1% male and 51.9% female. The population was made up of 720 Swiss men (37.7% of the population), and 199 (10.4%) non-Swiss men. There were 827 Swiss women (43.3%), and 163 (8.5%) non-Swiss women.

In 2008 there were 13 live births to Swiss citizens and 5 births to non-Swiss citizens, and in same time span there were 8 deaths of Swiss citizens and 1 non-Swiss citizen death. Ignoring immigration and emigration, the population of Swiss citizens increased by 5 while the foreign population increased by 4. There was 1 Swiss man who immigrated back to Switzerland. At the same time, there were 14 non-Swiss men and 13 non-Swiss women who immigrated from another country to Switzerland. The total Swiss population change in 2008 (from all sources, including moves across municipal borders) was an increase of 17 and the non-Swiss population change was an increase of 14 people. This represents a population growth rate of 1.7%.

The age distribution, as of 2009, in Canobbio is; 189 children or 9.9% of the population are between 0 and 9 years old and 199 teenagers or 10.4% are between 10 and 19. Of the adult population, 187 people or 9.8% of the population are between 20 and 29 years old. 289 people or 15.1% are between 30 and 39, 331 people or 17.3% are between 40 and 49, and 239 people or 12.5% are between 50 and 59. The senior population distribution is 218 people or 11.4% of the population are between 60 and 69 years old, 171 people or 9.0% are between 70 and 79, there are 86 people or 4.5% who are over 80.

As of 2000, there were 806 private households in the municipality, and an average of 2.2 persons per household. In 2000 there were 202 single family homes (or 46.5% of the total) out of a total of 434 inhabited buildings. There were 104 two family buildings (24.0%) and 91 multi-family buildings (21.0%). There were also 37 buildings in the municipality that were multipurpose buildings (used for both housing and commercial or another purpose).

The vacancy rate for the municipality, in 2008, was 0.09%. In 2000 there were 1,042 apartments in the municipality. The most common apartment size was the 4 room apartment of which there were 352. There were 71 single room apartments and 196 apartments with five or more rooms. Of these apartments, a total of 804 apartments (77.2% of the total) were permanently occupied, while 228 apartments (21.9%) were seasonally occupied and 10 apartments (1.0%) were empty. As of 2007, the construction rate of new housing units was 4.9 new units per 1000 residents.

The historical population is given in the following timeline:

== Politics ==
In the 2007 federal election the most popular party was the CVP which received 39.41% of the vote. The next three most popular parties were the Ticino League (16.64%), the FDP (16.34%) and the SP (14.59%). In the federal election, a total of 676 votes were cast, and the voter turnout was 54.9%.

In the 2007 Gran Consiglio election, there were a total of 1,211 registered voters in Canobbio, of which 860 or 71.0% voted. 14 blank ballots and 3 null ballots were cast, leaving 843 valid ballots in the election. The most popular party was the PPD+GenGiova which received 281 or 33.3% of the vote. The next three most popular parties were; the LEGA (with 137 or 16.3%), the LEGA (with 137 or 16.3%) and the PLRT (with 134 or 15.9%).

In the 2007 Consiglio di Stato election, 5 blank ballots and 4 null ballots were cast, leaving 851 valid ballots in the election. The most popular party was the PPD which received 278 or 32.7% of the vote. The next three most popular parties were; the LEGA (with 194 or 22.8%), the PLRT (with 126 or 14.8%) and the SSI (with 118 or 13.9%).

== Economy ==
As of 2007, Canobbio had an unemployment rate of 2.92%. As of 2005, there were 12 people employed in the primary economic sector and about 2 businesses involved in this sector. 144 people were employed in the secondary sector and there were 21 businesses in this sector. 1,040 people were employed in the tertiary sector, with 80 businesses in this sector. There were 889 residents of the municipality who were employed in some capacity, of which females made up 41.3% of the workforce.

In 2000, there were 1,048 workers who commuted into the municipality and 694 workers who commuted away. The municipality is a net importer of workers, with about 1.5 workers entering the municipality for every one leaving. About 15.8% of the workforce coming into Canobbio are coming from outside Switzerland, while 0.1% of the locals commute out of Switzerland for work. Of the working population, 9.4% used public transportation to get to work, and 64.8% used a private car.

== Religion ==
From the 2000 census, 1,513 or 82.9% were Roman Catholic, while 99 or 5.4% belonged to the Swiss Reformed Church. There are 164 individuals (or about 8.99% of the population) who belong to another church (not listed on the census), and 49 individuals (or about 2.68% of the population) did not answer the question.

== Education ==
The entire Swiss population is generally well educated. In Canobbio about 70.5% of the population (between age 25-64) have completed either non-mandatory upper secondary education or additional higher education (either University or a Fachhochschule).

In Canobbio there were a total of 322 students (as of 2009). The Ticino education system provides up to three years of non-mandatory kindergarten and in Canobbio there were 42 children in kindergarten. The primary school program lasts for five years and includes both a standard school and a special school. In the municipality, 104 students attended the standard primary schools and 1 student attended the special school. In the lower secondary school system, students either attend a two-year middle school followed by a two-year pre-apprenticeship or they attend a four-year program to prepare for higher education. There were 87 students in the two-year middle school, while 39 students were in the four-year advanced program.

The upper secondary school includes several options, but at the end of the upper secondary program, a student will be prepared to enter a trade or to continue on to a university or college. In Ticino, vocational students may either attend school while working on their internship or apprenticeship (which takes three or four years) or may attend school followed by an internship or apprenticeship (which takes one year as a full-time student or one and a half to two years as a part-time student). There were 23 vocational students who were attending school full-time and 24 who attend part-time.

The professional program lasts three years and prepares a student for a job in engineering, nursing, computer science, business, tourism and similar fields. There were 2 students in the professional program. As of 2000, there were 1,151 students in Canobbio who came from another municipality, while 62 residents attended schools outside the municipality.

Canobbio is home to 2 libraries. These libraries include; the Scuola universitaria professionale della Svizzera italiana SUPSI and the Dipartimento Ambiente Costruzioni e Design (DACD). There was a combined total (as of 2008) of 50,232 books or other media in the libraries, and in the same year a total of 8,606 items were loaned out.
