= Roveredo (disambiguation) =

Roveredo can refer to:

- Roveredo, municipality in the Moesa Region in the canton of Graubünden in Switzerland
- Roveredo, Ticino, village and former municipality in the canton of Ticino, Switzerland
- Roveredo in Piano, municipality in the Province of Pordenone in the Italian region Friuli-Venezia
- Roveredo di Guà, comune in the Province of Verona in the Italian region Veneto
