= Sala Capriasca =

Coordinates: 46°3′56″N 8°57′23″E

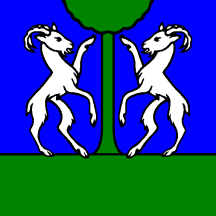
Flag

Sala Capriasca is a village and former municipality in the canton of Ticino, Switzerland.

In 2001 the municipality was merged with the other, neighboring municipalities Cagiallo, Lopagno, Roveredo, Tesserete and Vaglio to form a new and larger municipality Capriasca.

== History ==
Sala Capriasca is first mentioned in 1078 as Sale. In 1467 it was mentioned as Salla.

Sala Capriasca was originally a Lombard walled village. In the 15th century, it formed a Vicinanza with Bigorio. In the first half of the 16th century, had rights to the commons in the parish of Capriasca. It was part of the Tesserete parish until 1933.

The parish church of St. Anthony was first mentioned in 1413. In the 15th and 16th centuries, it was totally rebuilt. The monastery of Bigorio was founded in 1535 as the first seat of the Capuchins in Switzerland.

Economically the village was dominated by agriculture and rural handicrafts. The traditional seasonal migration brought extra income. In the second half of the 20th century, it developed into a bedroom community. In 2000, four-fifths of the working population were commuters, especially to Lugano.

The village was the birthplace of Argentine poet Alfonsina Storni.

== Location ==
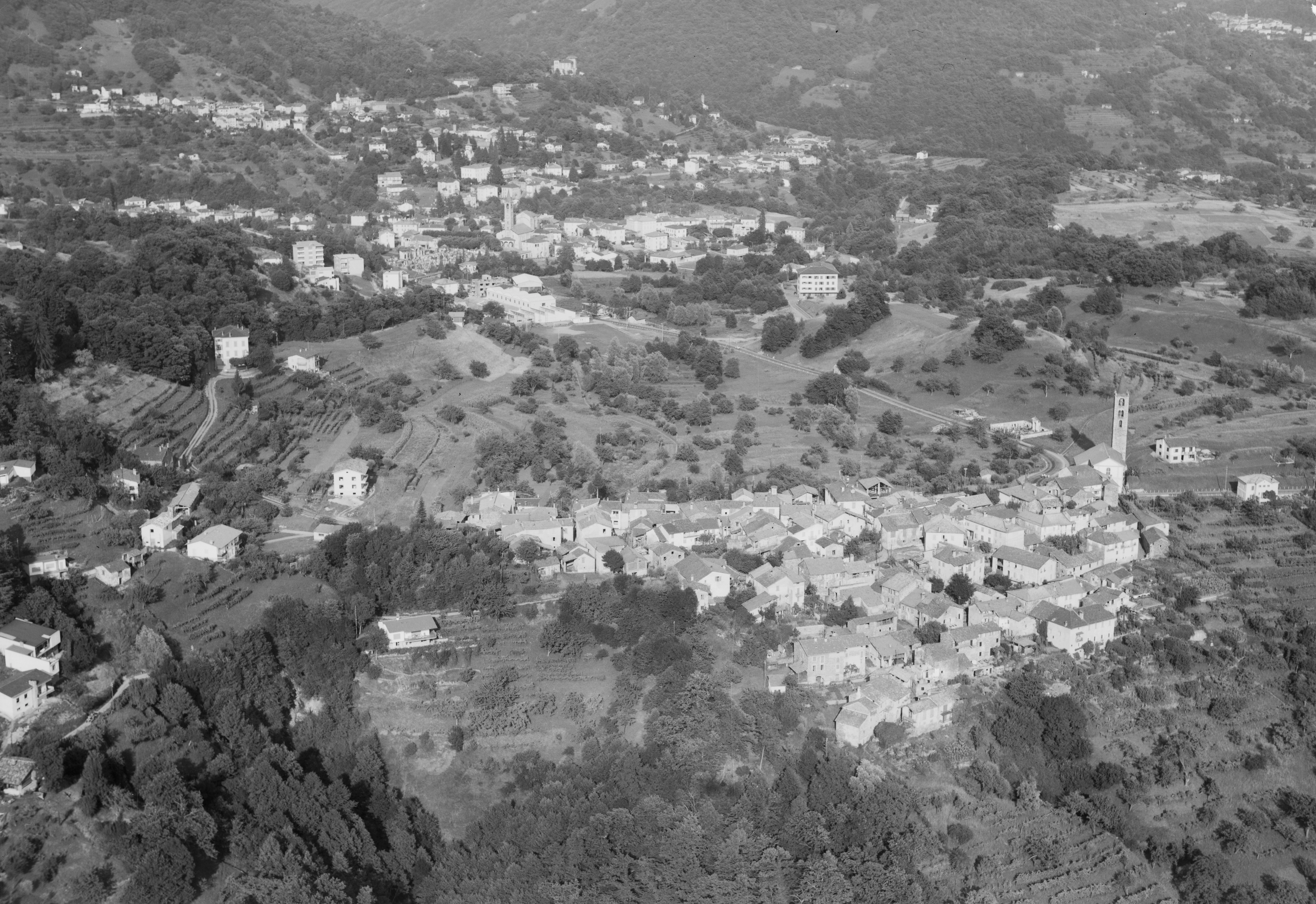
Aerial view (1964)

The village of Sala Capriasca is located in the Capriasca valley at the foot of Mount Bigorio and includes the settlements of Sala, Bigorio, Lelgio and Pezzolo.

== Historic population ==
The historical population is given in the following chart:
