= Campestro =

Village in the canton of Ticino, Switzerland

Coordinates: 46°4′17″N 8°58′14″E

Campestro is a village and former municipality in the district of Lugano in the canton of Ticino, Switzerland.

Campestro was a municipality of its own until 1976, when it was incorporated into its neighboring municipality Tesserete.

In turn, Tesserete municipality merged with its neighbors in 2001 to form a new and larger municipality Capriasca.
