= Criscione =

Criscione is an Italian surname. Notable people with the surname include:

- Dave Criscione (born 1951), American baseball player
- Erminio Criscione (1955–1992), Italian mass murderer
