= Vaglio =

Coordinates: 46°3′40″N 8°57′26″E

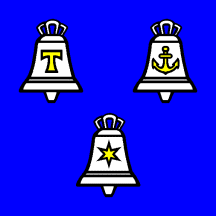
Flag

Vaglio is a village and former municipality in the canton of Ticino, Switzerland.

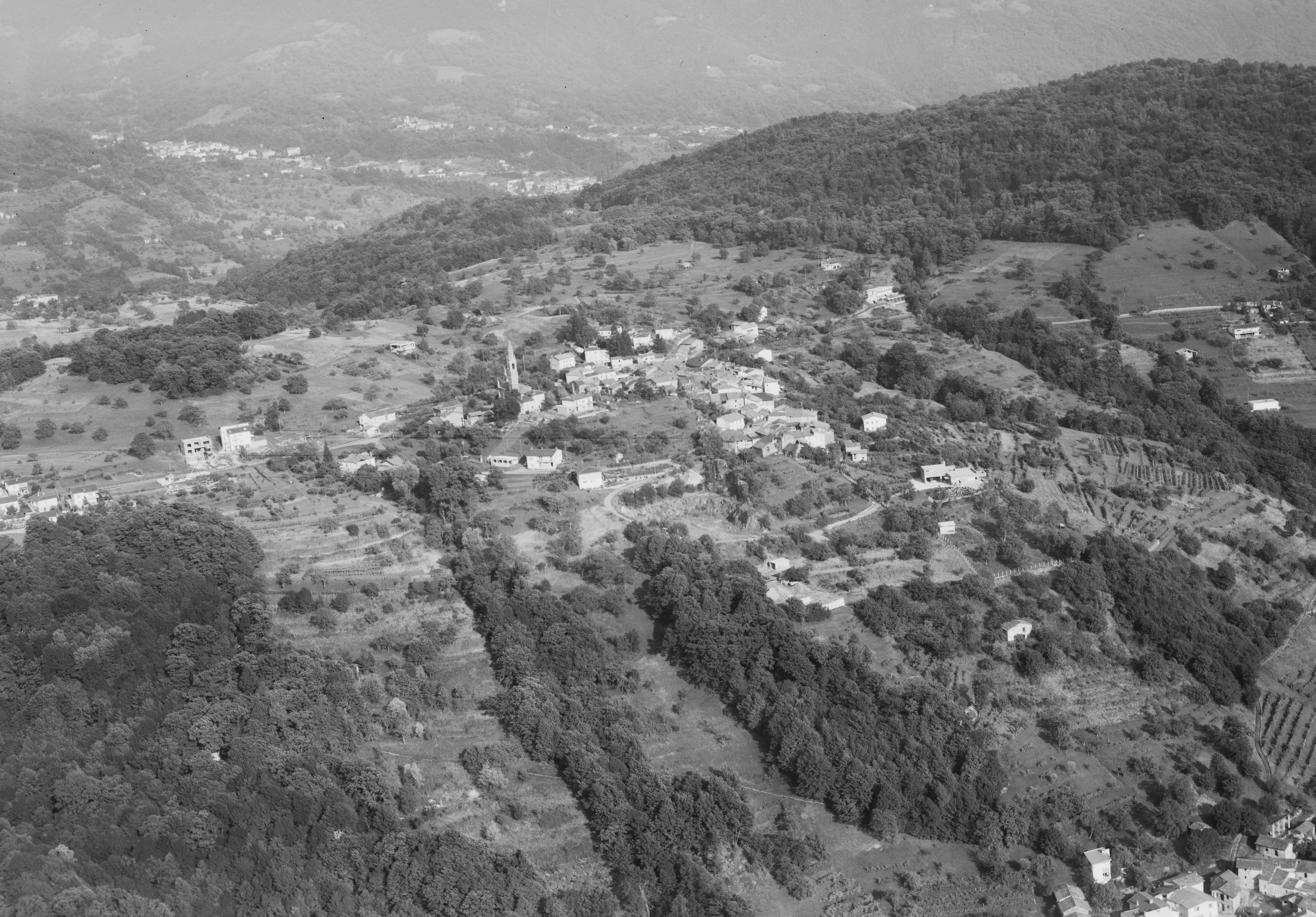
Aerial view (1964)

In 2001 the municipality was merged with the neighboring municipalities of Cagiallo, Lopagno, Roveredo, Sala Capriasca, and Tesserete to form a new municipality, Capriasca.
