= Tesserete =

Coordinates: 46°04′N 8°58′E

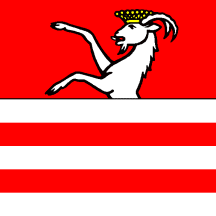
Flag

Tesserete is a village and former municipality in the canton of Ticino, Switzerland.

Aerial view (1950)

In 1976 the neighboring municipality Campestro was incorporated into Tesserete.

In 2001 Tesserete municipality was merged with the other, neighboring municipalities Cagiallo, Lopagno, Roveredo, Sala Capriasca and Vaglio to form a new and larger municipality Capriasca.

The village is famous in Ticino for its Carnival "Or Penagin".
