= Comano, Ticino =

Comano
- Municipality
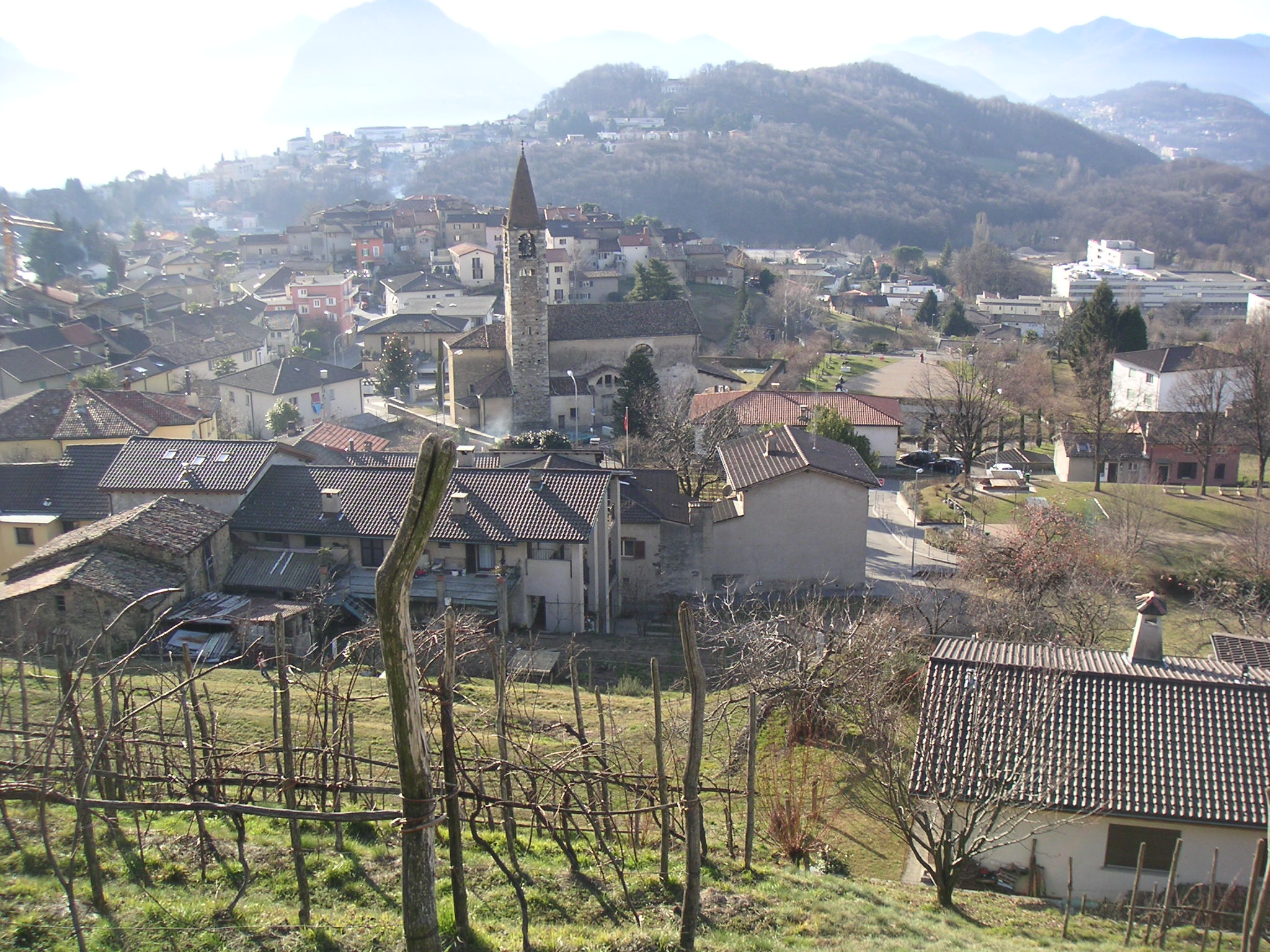

- Flag Coat of arms
- Location of Comano
- Location within Switzerland Location within Canton of Ticino
- Coordinates: 46°2′N 8°57′E
- Country: Switzerland
- Canton: Ticino
- District: Lugano

Government
  - Mayor: Sindaco

Area
  - Total: 2.06 km^{2} (0.80 sq mi)
- Elevation: 511 m (1,677 ft)

Population (December 2004)
  - Total: 1,698
  - Density: 824/km^{2} (2,130/sq mi)
- Time zone: UTC+01:00 (CET)
  - Summer (DST): UTC+02:00 (CEST)
- Postal code: 6949
- SFOS number: 5176
- ISO 3166 code: CH-TI
- Surrounded by: Canobbio, Capriasca, Cureglia, Origlio, Porza
- Website: http://www.comano.ch/ SFSO statistics

Comano is a municipality in the district of Lugano in the canton of Ticino in Switzerland.

It is the headquarters and studios of TSI (Televisione Svizzera di lingua Italiana).

== History ==
Comano is first mentioned in 1159 as Cumano.

== Geography ==
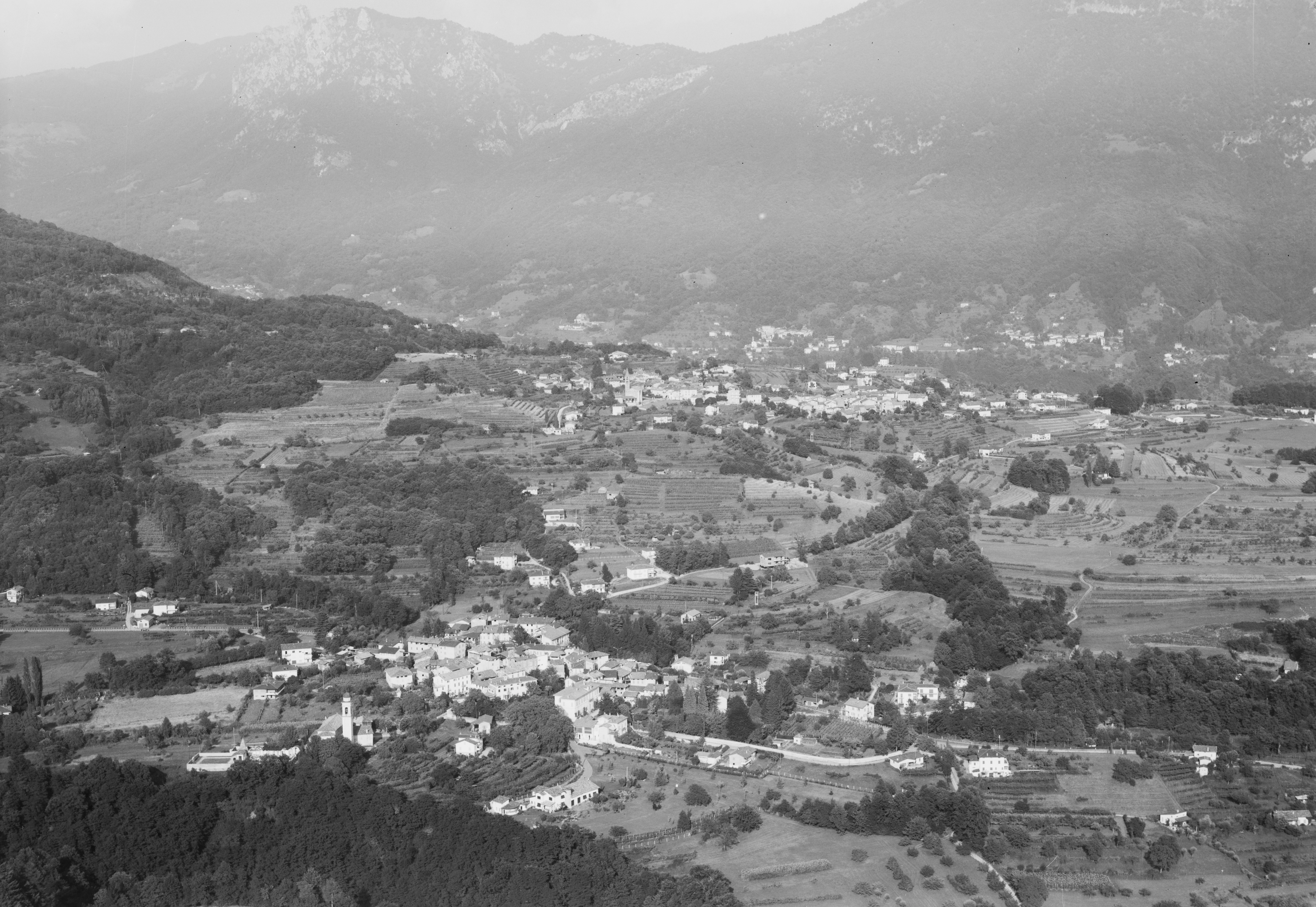
Aerial view (1964)

Comano has an area, as of 1997, of 2.06 square kilometers (0.80 sq mi). Of this area, 0.71 km^{2} (0.27 sq mi) or 34.5% is used for agricultural purposes, while 1.12 km^{2} (0.43 sq mi) or 54.4% is forested. Of the rest of the land, 0.7 km^{2} (0.27 sq mi) or 34.0% is settled (buildings or roads) and 0.01 km^{2} (2.5 acres) or 0.5% is unproductive land.

Of the built up area, housing and buildings made up 24.8% and transportation infrastructure made up 5.3%. Power and water infrastructure as well as other special developed areas made up 3.4% of the area Out of the forested land, 50.5% of the total land area is heavily forested and 3.9% is covered with orchards or small clusters of trees. Of the agricultural land, 6.8% is used for growing crops, while 2.9% is used for orchards or vine crops and 24.8% is used for alpine pastures.

The municipality is located in the Lugano district, on a hilly terrace north-west of Lugano.

== Coat of arms ==
The blazon of the municipal coat of arms is Per fess gules three fleurs de lis or in fess and also gules three bends or.

== Demographics ==
Comano has a population (as of December 2020) of 2,084. As of 2008, 11.2% of the population are resident foreign nationals. Over the last 10 years (1997–2007) the population has changed at a rate of 11.4%.

Most of the population (as of 2000) speaks Italian (85.0%), with German being second most common (10.2%) and French being third (2.1%). Of the Swiss national languages (as of 2000), 163 speak German, 34 people speak French, 1,355 people speak Italian, and 1 person speaks Romansh. The remainder (41 people) speak another language.

As of 2008, the gender distribution of the population was 46.5% male and 53.5% female. The population was made up of 772 Swiss men (40.5% of the population), and 113 (5.9%) non-Swiss men. There were 924 Swiss women (48.5%), and 96 (5.0%) non-Swiss women.

In 2008 there were 10 live births to Swiss citizens and were 12 deaths of Swiss citizens and 2 non-Swiss citizen deaths. Ignoring immigration and emigration, the population of Swiss citizens decreased by 2 while the foreign population decreased by 2. There were 2 Swiss men and 2 Swiss women who emigrated from Switzerland. At the same time, there were 11 non-Swiss men and 5 non-Swiss women who immigrated from another country to Switzerland. The total Swiss population change in 2008 (from all sources, including moves across municipal borders) was an increase of 30 and the non-Swiss population change was an increase of 28 people. This represents a population growth rate of 3.2%.

The age distribution, as of 2009, in Comano is; 200 children or 10.5% of the population are between 0 and 9 years old and 178 teenagers or 9.3% are between 10 and 19. Of the adult population, 206 people or 10.8% of the population are between 20 and 29 years old. 255 people or 13.4% are between 30 and 39, 303 people or 15.9% are between 40 and 49, and 269 people or 14.1% are between 50 and 59. The senior population distribution is 246 people or 12.9% of the population are between 60 and 69 years old, 142 people or 7.5% are between 70 and 79, there are 106 people or 5.6% who are over 80.

As of 2000, there were 662 private households in the municipality, and an average of 2.4 persons per household. In 2000 there were 308 single family homes (or 63.0% of the total) out of a total of 489 inhabited buildings. There were 105 two family buildings (21.5%) and 57 multi-family buildings (11.7%). There were also 19 buildings in the municipality that were multipurpose buildings (used for both housing and commercial or another purpose).

The vacancy rate for the municipality, in 2008, was 0.58%. In 2000 there were 780 apartments in the municipality. The most common apartment size was the 5 room apartment of which there were 313. There were 14 single room apartments and 313 apartments with five or more rooms. Of these apartments, a total of 659 apartments (84.5% of the total) were permanently occupied, while 108 apartments (13.8%) were seasonally occupied and 13 apartments (1.7%) were empty. As of 2007, the construction rate of new housing units was 9 new units per 1000 residents.

The historical population is given in the following chart:

== Politics ==
In the 2007 federal election the most popular party was the FDP which received 27.61% of the vote. The next three most popular parties were the SP (24.22%), the CVP (20.05%) and the Ticino League (11.14%). In the federal election, a total of 789 votes were cast, and the voter turnout was 59.3%.

In the 2007 Gran Consiglio election, there were a total of 1,338 registered voters in Comano, of which 938 or 70.1% voted. 15 blank ballots were cast, leaving 923 valid ballots in the election. The most popular party was the PLRT which received 257 or 27.8% of the vote. The next three most popular parties were; the PS (with 210 or 22.8%), the SSI (with 149 or 16.1%) and the PPD+GenGiova (with 113 or 12.2%).

In the 2007 Consiglio di Stato election, 8 blank ballots and 3 null ballots were cast, leaving 927 valid ballots in the election. The most popular party was the PS which received 249 or 26.9% of the vote. The next three most popular parties were; the PLRT (with 248 or 26.8%), the LEGA (with 155 or 16.7%) and the SSI (with 124 or 13.4%).

== Economy ==
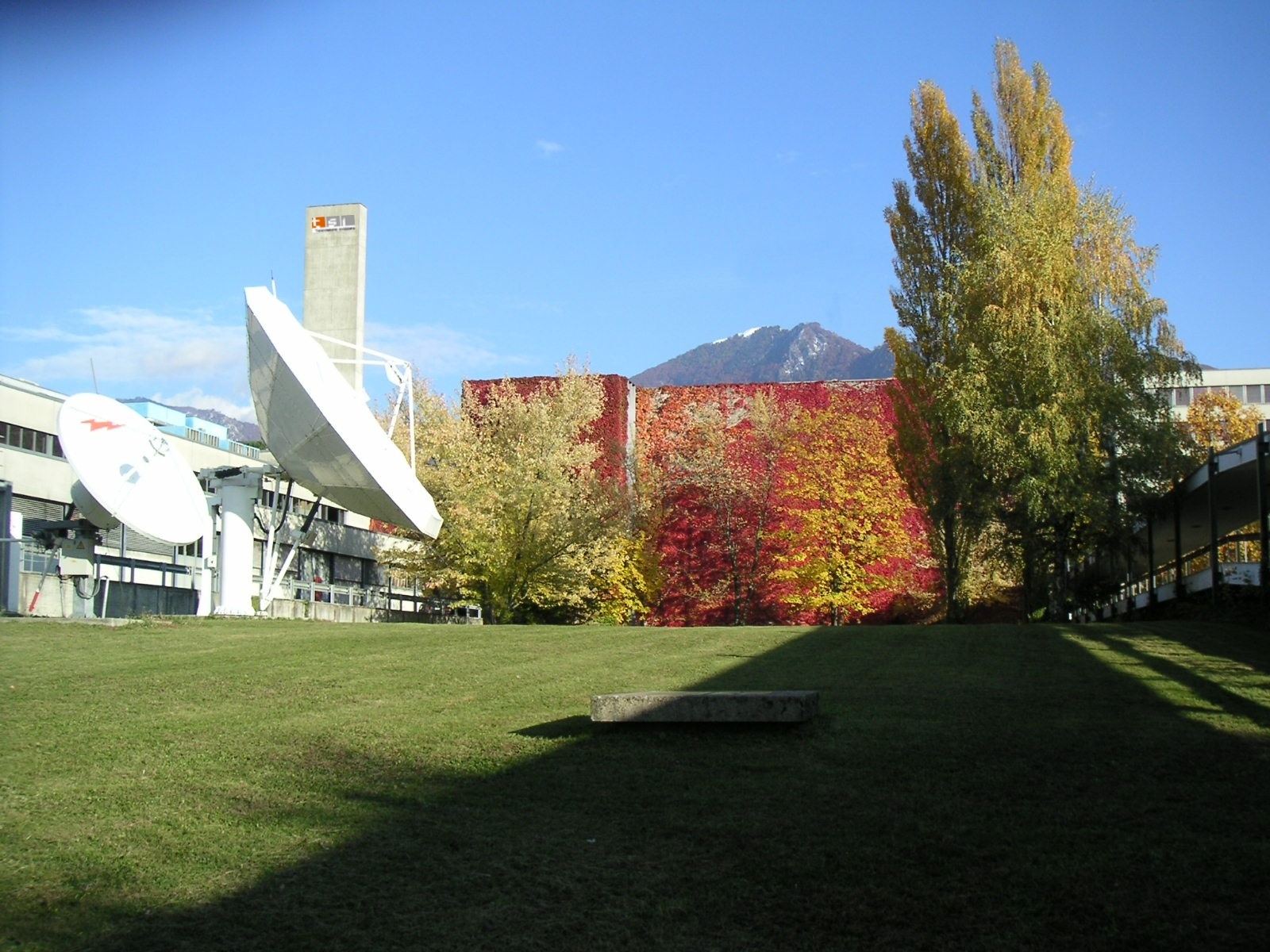
TSI headquarter in Comano

As of 2007, Comano had an unemployment rate of 1.69%. As of 2005, there were 11 people employed in the primary economic sector and about 6 businesses involved in this sector. 46 people were employed in the secondary sector and there were 7 businesses in this sector. 716 people were employed in the tertiary sector, with 35 businesses in this sector. There were 718 residents of the municipality who were employed in some capacity, of which females made up 40.4% of the workforce.

In 2000, there were 822 workers who commuted into the municipality and 540 workers who commuted away. The municipality is a net importer of workers, with about 1.5 workers entering the municipality for every one leaving. About 6.0% of the workforce coming into Comano are coming from outside Switzerland. Of the working population, 8.2% used public transportation to get to work, and 67.1% used a private car.

As of 2009, there were 2 hotels in Comano.

The offices and studios of the Italian language television station TSI 1/La 1, which is part of the Radiotelevisione svizzera di lingua italiana group, is in Comano.

== Religion ==
From the 2000 census, 1,191 or 74.7% were Roman Catholic, while 146 or 9.2% belonged to the Swiss Reformed Church. There are 222 individuals (or about 13.93% of the population) who belong to another church (not listed on the census), and 35 individuals (or about 2.20% of the population) did not answer the question.

== Education ==
The entire Swiss population is generally well educated. In Comano about 84.6% of the population (between age 25-64) have completed either non-mandatory upper secondary education or additional higher education (either University or a Fachhochschule).

In Comano there were a total of 305 students (as of 2009). The Ticino education system provides up to three years of non-mandatory kindergarten and in Comano there were 63 children in kindergarten. The primary school program lasts for five years and includes both a standard school and a special school. In the municipality, 95 students attended the standard primary schools and 1 student attended the special school. In the lower secondary school system, students either attend a two-year middle school followed by a two-year pre-apprenticeship or they attend a four-year program to prepare for higher education. There were 61 students in the two-year middle school and 1 in their pre-apprenticeship, while 53 students were in the four-year advanced program.

The upper secondary school includes several options, but at the end of the upper secondary program, a student will be prepared to enter a trade or to continue on to a university or college. In Ticino, vocational students may either attend school while working on their internship or apprenticeship (which takes three or four years) or may attend school followed by an internship or apprenticeship (which takes one year as a full-time student or one and a half to two years as a part-time student). There were 14 vocational students who were attending school full-time and 16 who attend part-time.

The professional program lasts three years and prepares a student for a job in engineering, nursing, computer science, business, tourism and similar fields. There was 1 student in the professional program.

As of 2000, there were 31 students in Comano who came from another municipality, while 162 residents attended schools outside the municipality.
