= Porza =

- Municipality
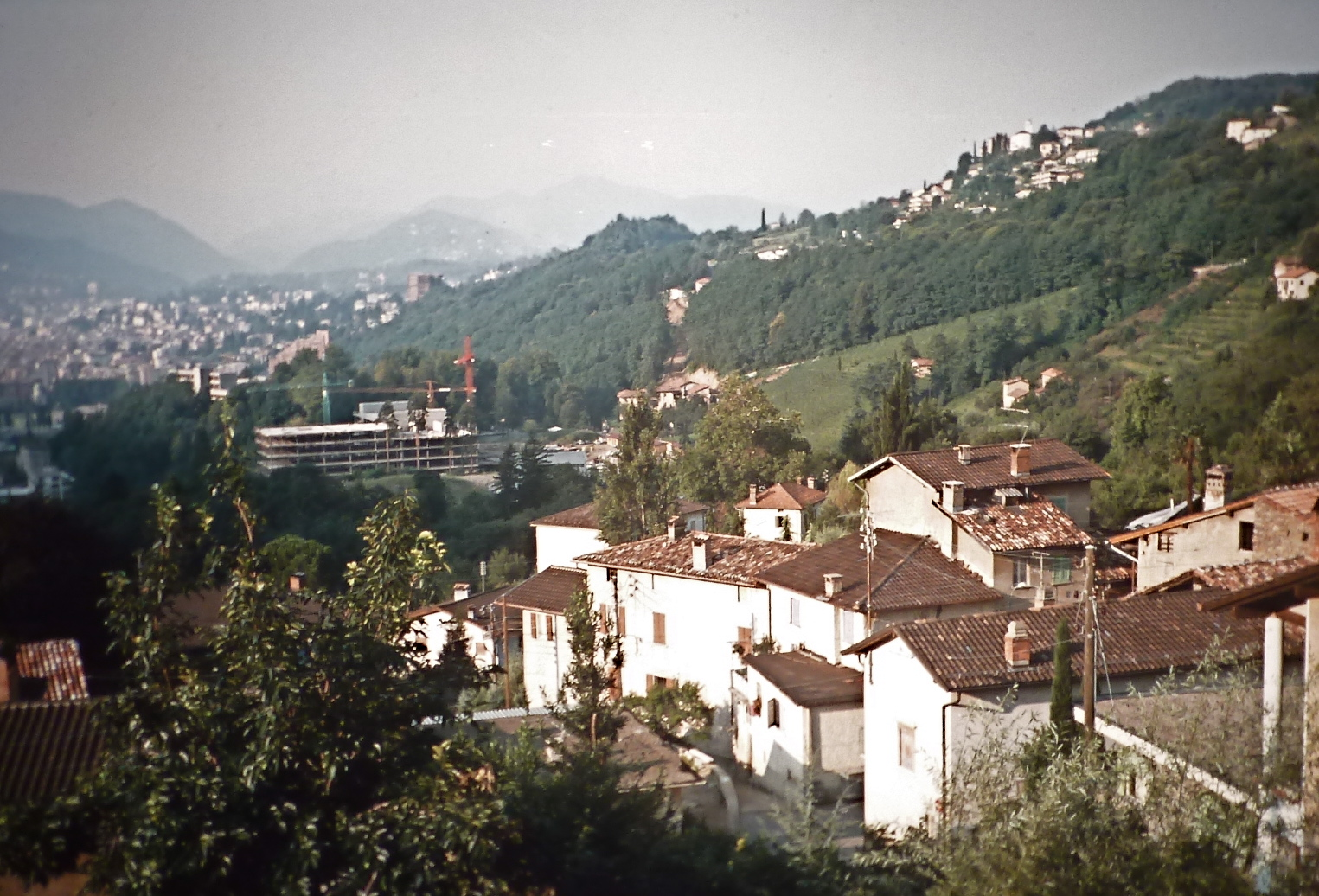

- Flag Coat of arms
- Location of Porza
- Location within Switzerland Location within Canton of Ticino
- Coordinates: 46°01′N 8°57′E
- Country: Switzerland
- Canton: Ticino
- District: Lugano

Government
  - Mayor: Sindaco

Area
  - Total: 1.58 km^{2} (0.61 sq mi)
- Elevation: 483 m (1,585 ft)

Population (December 2004)
  - Total: 1,477
  - Density: 935/km^{2} (2,420/sq mi)
- Time zone: UTC+01:00 (CET)
  - Summer (DST): UTC+02:00 (CEST)
- Postal code: 6948
- SFOS number: 5214
- ISO 3166 code: CH-TI
- Surrounded by: Canobbio, Comano, Cureglia, Lugano, Savosa, Vezia
- Website: www.porza.ch

Porza is a municipality in the district of Lugano in the canton of Ticino in Switzerland.

== History ==
Aerial view (1948)

Porza is first mentioned around 1297−99 as Porza.

1907-08 several cremation graves along with grave goods from the Iron Age were discovered. During the Middle Ages the Benedictine abbey of San Pietro in Ciel d'Oro owned land in Porza. On a hill northeast of Porza was Trevano castle, which was probably built in the 12th century by the Bishop of Como. It was owned by the Brocchi family, from Como and later by the Trevano and Quadri families. On the castle's foundations a villa was built in 1871. During the Belle Époque the glamorous and wealthy met here, and musicians from across Europe presented themselves to give concerts. In 1934, the district purchased the villa. It was demolished in 1961 and replaced with a school, which is now part of the Scuola universitaria professionale della Svizzera italiana (university of Italian Switzerland).

Porza's church was under the parish church S. Lorenzo in Lugano until 1468, followed by the parish of Comano. It became an independent parish in 1647. The Church of SS. Bernardino e Martino dates from the 16th century and was restored 1974.

Historically, the local economy relied on farming as well as craftsmen (Maestranze) emigrating to other countries. At the beginning of the 21st century, it has become a residential community for the agglomeration of Lugano. Since the 1960s, a substantial proportion of the population comes from abroad or the rest of Switzerland. In the valley along the Cassarate river, an industrial and trade development zone has grown up. In 1992−95, a skating rink was built in Resega near the river. In 2000, about three-quarters of the workforce commutes.

== Geography ==
Porza has an area, as of 1997, of 1.58 square kilometers (0.61 sq mi). Of this area, 0.68 km^{2} (0.26 sq mi) or 43.0% is used for agricultural purposes, while 0.66 km^{2} (0.25 sq mi) or 41.8% is forested. Of the rest of the land, 0.68 km^{2} (0.26 sq mi) or 43.0% is settled (buildings or roads) and 0.03 km^{2} (7.4 acres) or 1.9% is unproductive land.

Of the built up area, industrial buildings made up 2.5% of the total area while housing and buildings made up 29.1% and transportation infrastructure made up 8.2%. Power and water infrastructure as well as other special developed areas made up 2.5% of the area Out of the forested land, 38.6% of the total land area is heavily forested and 3.2% is covered with orchards or small clusters of trees. Of the agricultural land, 10.8% is used for growing crops, while 3.2% is used for orchards or vine crops and 29.1% is used for alpine pastures.

The municipality is located in the Lugano district, north-west of Lugano. It consists of the village of Porza and the hamlets of Vira, Trevano and Belvedere in along the hills, as well as Cornaredo and Resega in the valley.

== Coat of arms ==
The blazon of the municipal coat of arms is Azure a sun in splendor and a base serrated both or.

== Demographics ==
Porza has a population (as of December 2020) of 1,547. As of 2008, 19.4% of the population are resident foreign nationals. Over the last 10 years (1997–2007) the population has changed at a rate of 10.8%.

Most of the population (as of 2000) speaks Italian (83.2%), with German being second most common (10.1%) and French being third (2.2%). Of the Swiss national languages (as of 2000), 136 speak German, 30 people speak French, 1,122 people speak Italian, and 2 people speak Romansh. The remainder (58 people) speak another language.

As of 2008, the gender distribution of the population was 49.2% male and 50.8% female. The population was made up of 586 Swiss men (38.7% of the population), and 159 (10.5%) non-Swiss men. There were 631 Swiss women (41.7%), and 139 (9.2%) non-Swiss women.

In 2008 there were 18 live births to Swiss citizens and 2 births to non-Swiss citizens, and in same time span there were 4 deaths of Swiss citizens and 1 non-Swiss citizen death. Ignoring immigration and emigration, the population of Swiss citizens increased by 14 while the foreign population increased by 1. There were 2 Swiss men who emigrated from Switzerland. At the same time, there were 8 non-Swiss men and 3 non-Swiss women who immigrated from another country to Switzerland. The total Swiss population change in 2008 (from all sources, including moves across municipal borders) was an increase of 31 and the non-Swiss population change was a decrease of 5 people. This represents a population growth rate of 1.8%.

The age distribution, as of 2009, in Porza is; 157 children or 10.4% of the population are between 0 and 9 years old and 164 teenagers or 10.8% are between 10 and 19. Of the adult population, 141 people or 9.3% of the population are between 20 and 29 years old. 225 people or 14.9% are between 30 and 39, 277 people or 18.3% are between 40 and 49, and 211 people or 13.9% are between 50 and 59. The senior population distribution is 172 people or 11.4% of the population are between 60 and 69 years old, 109 people or 7.2% are between 70 and 79, there are 59 people or 3.9% who are over 80.

As of 2000, there were 586 private households in the municipality, and an average of 2.3 persons per household. In 2000 there were 233 single family homes (or 64.7% of the total) out of a total of 360 inhabited buildings. There were 62 two family buildings (17.2%) and 49 multi-family buildings (13.6%). There were also 16 buildings in the municipality that were multipurpose buildings (used for both housing and commercial or another purpose).

The vacancy rate for the municipality, in 2008, was 0%. In 2000 there were 692 apartments in the municipality. The most common apartment size was the 5 room apartment of which there were 216. There were 19 single room apartments and 216 apartments with five or more rooms. Of these apartments, a total of 584 apartments (84.4% of the total) were permanently occupied, while 98 apartments (14.2%) were seasonally occupied and 10 apartments (1.4%) were empty. As of 2007, the construction rate of new housing units was 3.4 new units per 1000 residents.

The historical population is given in the following chart:

== Politics ==
In the 2007 federal election the most popular party was the FDP which received 29.15% of the vote. The next three most popular parties were the CVP (26.22%), the SP (14.66%) and the SVP (12.17%). In the federal election, a total of 505 votes were cast, and the voter turnout was 53.7%.

In the 2007 Gran Consiglio election, there were a total of 954 registered voters in Porza, of which 682 or 71.5% voted. Three blank ballots and 4 null ballots were cast, leaving 675 valid ballots in the election. The most popular party was the PLRT which received 188 or 27.9% of the vote. The next three most popular parties were; the PPD+GenGiova (with 162 or 24.0%), the SSI (with 118 or 17.5%) and the LEGA (with 72 or 10.7%).

In the 2007 Consiglio di Stato election, 6 blank ballots were cast, leaving 676 valid ballots in the election. The most popular party was the PLRT which received 170 or 25.1% of the vote. The next three most popular parties were; the PPD (with 149 or 22.0%), the LEGA (with 144 or 21.3%) and the SSI (with 106 or 15.7%).

== Economy ==
As of 2007, Porza had an unemployment rate of 2.63%. As of 2005, there were 7 people employed in the primary economic sector and about 2 businesses involved in this sector. 154 people were employed in the secondary sector and there were 15 businesses in this sector. 585 people were employed in the tertiary sector, with 56 businesses in this sector. There were 670 residents of the municipality who were employed in some capacity, of which females made up 41.0% of the workforce.

In 2000, there were 352 workers who commuted into the municipality and 570 workers who commuted away. The municipality is a net exporter of workers, with about 1.6 workers leaving the municipality for every one entering. About 25.9% of the workforce coming into Porza are coming from outside Switzerland, while 0.5% of the locals commute out of Switzerland for work. Of the working population, 8.2% used public transportation to get to work, and 69.9% used a private car.

== Religion ==
From the 2000 census, 1,066 or 79.1% were Roman Catholic, while 115 or 8.5% belonged to the Swiss Reformed Church. There are 136 individuals (or about 10.09% of the population) who belong to another church (not listed on the census), and 31 individuals (or about 2.30% of the population) did not answer the question.

== Education ==
In Porza about 80.1% of the population (between age 25 and 64) have completed either non-mandatory upper secondary education or additional higher education (either university or a Fachhochschule).

In Porza there were a total of 262 students (as of 2009). The Ticino education system provides up to three years of non-mandatory kindergarten and in Porza there were 31 children in kindergarten. The primary school program lasts for five years. In the municipality, 87 students attended the standard primary schools. In the lower secondary school system, students either attend a two-year middle school followed by a two-year pre-apprenticeship or they attend a four-year program to prepare for higher education. There were 71 students in the two-year middle school, while 45 students were in the four-year advanced program.

The upper secondary school includes several options, but at the end of the upper secondary program, a student will be prepared to enter a trade or to continue on to a university or college. In Ticino, vocational students may either attend school while working on their internship or apprenticeship (which takes three or four years) or may attend school followed by an internship or apprenticeship (which takes one year as a full-time student or one and a half to two years as a part-time student). There were 12 vocational students who were attending school full-time and 13 who attend part-time.

The professional program lasts three years and prepares a student for a job in engineering, nursing, computer science, business, tourism and similar fields. There were 3 students in the professional program.

As of 2000, there were 12 students in Porza who came from another municipality, while 180 residents attended schools outside the municipality.

== Notable residents ==
Clay Regazzoni was born in Porza.
