= Rivera massacre =

1992 mass shooting in Switzerland

- Origlio (Canton of Ticino) Origlio (Switzerland)
- Location: 46.051°N 8.949°E; Origlio, Rivera, Massagno, Lugano District, Canton of Ticino, Switzerland
- Date: 4 March 1992; 7:00-8:30 p.m. (UTC+1)
- Weapon: Norinco AK-Style 7.62mm Semi-Automatic Rifle
- Deaths: 6
- Injuries: 6
- Perpetrator: Erminio Criscione

The Rivera massacre was a spree shooting that occurred on 4 March 1992, in several towns in the Canton of Ticino, Switzerland. Erminio Criscione, an Italian emigrant, shot six people dead and wounded six others. He hanged himself while in custody five days later.

== Shootings ==
On the evening of 4 March, Criscione armed himself with a Kalashnikov rifle and drove to the house of his friend and co-worker in Origlio. The friend came to the door after Criscione rang the bell, and when the door opened Criscione fired twice, hitting his friend in each leg. Criscione turned around and walked away around 7:25 p.m.

At 7:45 p.m. in Soresina Criscione attacked the family of another co-worker who were preparing for dinner. He shot and killed four members of the family and wounded three others.

At 8:00 p.m., he went on to kill two more colleagues before moving on to his final target, his boss. Twenty minutes later, Criscione arrived at the home of his boss in Massagno. His boss was not home and instead Criscione was greeted by the man's wife whom Criscione promptly shot twice in the legs before being told, "Tell him I'll be back". Criscione was looking for Adriano Cavadini in the Camorino and was arrested at 9:15 p.m. whilst in his car. He turned himself in without a struggle. After the arrest, he was silent and cried.

== Perpetrator ==
Photo of Criscione.

Erminio Criscione, born December 3, 1955, was an Italian emigrant from Mineo. He was on a wholesale meat suppliers training course when the shooting occurred, in which he targeted former colleagues. His acquaintances described him as a quiet man who loved animals. Criscione was noted to have some financial difficulties, and had failed a class taught by one of the men he killed.

On 9 March 1992, between 5:45 pm and 8:00 pm, Criscione hanged himself in a cell at the police headquarters with a sheet knotted to the window bars. Paramedics and the police tried unsuccessfully to revive him. He timed his suicide for the changing of his guards. He had been watched closely in custody and the police took extra precautions against suicide, despite the fact that Criscione had not mentioned any suicidal ideation in an interrogation the day prior.
