= Cagiallo =

Village in the canton of Ticino, Switzerland

Coordinates: 46°04′N 8°59′E

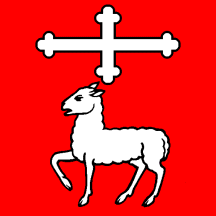
Flag

Cagiallo is a village and former municipality in the canton of Ticino, Switzerland.

In 2001 the municipality was merged with the other, neighboring municipalities Lopagno, Roveredo, Sala Capriasca, Tesserete and Vaglio to form a new and larger municipality Capriasca.

== History ==
Cagiallo is first mentioned in the 13th Century as Guzallo. In 1335 it was mentioned as Cazallo. Together with Lopagno and Campestro, Cagiallo formed a Bürgergemeinde from the Middle Ages through the modern era.

The late medieval church of S. Matteo was rebuilt 1672, but retained the romanesque clock tower. The village was part of the parish of Tesserete. The Chapel of St. Lucia is first mentioned in 1606, and the Chapel of St. Sebastian in Almatro was built in 1682.

The pre-industrial economy was based on agriculture and emigration. In the 18th and 19th Centuries, the Battaglini family played an important role throughout the valley. Cagiallo supports the tourist facilities and hotels of the village of Tesserete, and has become a suburb of it in recent years.

== Geography ==
The former municipality also contained the villages Sarone, Almatro, Bettagno and San Matteo-Muralta.

== Historic population ==
The historical population is given in the following chart:
