= Savosa =

- Municipality
- Flag Coat of arms
- Location of Savosa
- Location within Switzerland Location within Canton of Ticino
- Coordinates: 46°01′N 8°57′E
- Country: Switzerland
- Canton: Ticino
- District: Lugano

Government
  - Mayor: Sindaco

Area
  - Total: 0.74 km^{2} (0.29 sq mi)
- Elevation: 437 m (1,434 ft)

Population (December 2004)
  - Total: 2,065
  - Density: 2,800/km^{2} (7,200/sq mi)
- Time zone: UTC+01:00 (CET)
  - Summer (DST): UTC+02:00 (CEST)
- Postal code: 6942
- SFOS number: 5221
- ISO 3166 code: CH-TI
- Surrounded by: Lugano, Massagno, Porza, Vezia
- Website: www.savosa.ch

Savosa is a municipality in the district of Lugano in the canton of Ticino in Switzerland.

== History ==
Savosa is first mentioned in 1335 as Savoxa.

In the Middle Ages Savosa and Rovello were two separate Vicinanza, which were under the Pieve of Lugano. The cathedral of San Lorenzo in Lugano possessed extensive lands in Rovello in the 11th and 12th centuries. In the 14th century the Bishop of Como had feudal rights in both Savosa and Rovello.

The S. Maurizio complex in Rovello, which is now part of Lugano, consisted of a farmhouse, a chapel (mentioned in 1203) and a cemetery. It was founded by the Humiliati order. In 1365 it was taken over by the Bishop of Como and the Hospital of S. Maria in Lugano. The sugar magnate Emilio Maraini purchased the complex in 1906.

Savosa was part of the parish of Lugano until 1801 when it went to the Porza parish. It became an independent parish in 1825 and was joined by Rovello and Crocifisso in 1927. The parish church of Beata Vergine Annunciata was first mentioned in 1578, was rebuilt several times in the 18th and 19th centuries and restored in 1993.

The local economy was based on agriculture, with some trade and industry, especially in the 20th century. In 1903 a nursery opened, followed in 1907 by a vineyard. In the second half of the 20th century, several companies in the real estate and construction sector settled in the hamlet of Crocifisso. The hamlets 1957 link to the city's tramway network and location near Lugano made it an attractive site. This development led to growth throughout the municipality. The high school Gymnasium Lugano 2 was built in Savosa. In 2000, four-fifths of the working population are commuters, especially to Lugano.

== Geography ==
Savosa has an area, as of 1997, of 0.74 square kilometers (0.29 sq mi). Of this area, 0.45 km^{2} (0.17 sq mi) or 60.8% is used for agricultural purposes, while 0.13 km^{2} (0.050 sq mi) or 17.6% is forested. Of the rest of the land, 0.54 km^{2} (0.21 sq mi) or 73.0% is settled (buildings or roads).

Of the built up area, housing and buildings made up 51.4% and transportation infrastructure made up 16.2%. Power and water infrastructure as well as other special developed areas made up 2.7% of the area while parks, green belts and sports fields made up 2.7%. Out of the forested land, 8.1% of the total land area is heavily forested and 9.5% is covered with orchards or small clusters of trees. Of the agricultural land, 8.1% is used for growing crops, while 1.4% is used for orchards or vine crops and 51.4% is used for alpine pastures.

The municipality is located in the Lugano district, and forms the north-west part of the agglomeration of Lugano. It consists of the village of Savosa, the hamlet of Crocifisso and since 1804 part of the former municipality of Rovello.

== Coat of arms ==
The blazon of the municipal coat of arms is Argent a bend sinister abased gules ensigned with a robin proper.

== Demographics ==
Savosa has a population (as of December 2020) of 2,219. As of 2008, 30.8% of the population are resident foreign nationals. Over the last 10 years (1997–2007) the population has changed at a rate of -0.4%.

Most of the population (as of 2000) speaks Italian (83.0%), with German being second most common (8.7%) and French being third (2.0%). Of the Swiss national languages (as of 2000), 179 speak German, 41 people speak French, 1,710 people speak Italian, and 2 people speak Romansh. The remainder (129 people) speak another language.

As of 2008, the gender distribution of the population was 48.2% male and 51.8% female. The population was made up of 647 Swiss men (30.7% of the population), and 368 (17.5%) non-Swiss men. There were 789 Swiss women (37.4%), and 303 (14.4%) non-Swiss women.

In 2008 there were 14 live births to Swiss citizens and 5 births to non-Swiss citizens, and in same time span there were 15 deaths of Swiss citizens and 5 non-Swiss citizen deaths. Ignoring immigration and emigration, the population of Swiss citizens decreased by 1 while the foreign population remained the same. There were 2 Swiss men and 3 Swiss women who emigrated from Switzerland. At the same time, there were 26 non-Swiss men and 21 non-Swiss women who immigrated from another country to Switzerland. The total Swiss population change in 2008 (from all sources, including moves across municipal borders) was a decrease of 25 and the non-Swiss population change was an increase of 53 people. This represents a population growth rate of 1.4%.

The age distribution, as of 2009, in Savosa is; 193 children or 9.2% of the population are between 0 and 9 years old and 204 teenagers or 9.7% are between 10 and 19. Of the adult population, 200 people or 9.5% of the population are between 20 and 29 years old. 302 people or 14.3% are between 30 and 39, 339 people or 16.1% are between 40 and 49, and 296 people or 14.0% are between 50 and 59. The senior population distribution is 257 people or 12.2% of the population are between 60 and 69 years old, 178 people or 8.4% are between 70 and 79, there are 138 people or 6.5% who are over 80.

As of 2000, there were 862 private households in the municipality, and an average of 2.2 persons per household. In 2000 there were 158 single family homes (or 49.5% of the total) out of a total of 319 inhabited buildings. There were 60 two family buildings (18.8%) and 55 multi-family buildings (17.2%). There were also 46 buildings in the municipality that were multipurpose buildings (used for both housing and commercial or another purpose).

The vacancy rate for the municipality, in 2008, was 0.5%. In 2000 there were 960 apartments in the municipality. The most common apartment size was the 3 room apartment of which there were 316. There were 30 single room apartments and 213 apartments with five or more rooms. Of these apartments, a total of 861 apartments (89.7% of the total) were permanently occupied, while 57 apartments (5.9%) were seasonally occupied and 42 apartments (4.4%) were empty. As of 2007, the construction rate of new housing units was 2.5 new units per 1000 residents.

The historical population is given in the following chart:

== Politics ==
In the 2007 federal election the most popular party was the CVP which received 30.83% of the vote. The next three most popular parties were the FDP (22.7%), the SP (15.86%) and the Ticino League (14.34%). In the federal election, a total of 626 votes were cast, and the voter turnout was 51.3%.

In the 2007 Gran Consiglio election, there were a total of 1,247 registered voters in Savosa, of which 798 or 64.0% voted. 13 blank ballots and 4 null ballots were cast, leaving 781 valid ballots in the election. The most popular party was the PPD+GenGiova which received 200 or 25.6% of the vote. The next three most popular parties were; the SSI (with 157 or 20.1%), the PLRT (with 142 or 18.2%) and the LEGA (with 104 or 13.3%).

In the 2007 Consiglio di Stato election, 4 blank ballots and 5 null ballots were cast, leaving 789 valid ballots in the election. The most popular party was the PPD which received 214 or 27.1% of the vote. The next three most popular parties were; the LEGA (with 158 or 20.0%), the PLRT (with 134 or 17.0%) and the SSI (with 124 or 15.7%).

== Economy ==
As of 2007, Savosa had an unemployment rate of 3.24%. As of 2005, there were people employed in the primary economic sector and about businesses involved in this sector. 196 people were employed in the secondary sector and there were 20 businesses in this sector. 566 people were employed in the tertiary sector, with 98 businesses in this sector. There were 998 residents of the municipality who were employed in some capacity, of which females made up 41.7% of the workforce.

In 2000, there were 727 workers who commuted into the municipality and 832 workers who commuted away. The municipality is a net exporter of workers, with about 1.1 workers leaving the municipality for every one entering. About 19.7% of the workforce coming into Savosa are coming from outside Switzerland, while 0.8% of the locals commute out of Switzerland for work. Of the working population, 16.1% used public transportation to get to work, and 56.2% used a private car.

== Religion ==
From the 2000 census, 1,645 or 79.8% were Roman Catholic, while 160 or 7.8% belonged to the Swiss Reformed Church. There are 204 individuals (or about 9.90% of the population) who belong to another church (not listed on the census), and 52 individuals (or about 2.52% of the population) did not answer the question.

== Education ==
In Savosa about 74.7% of the population (between age 25 and 64) have completed either non-mandatory upper secondary education or additional higher education (either university or a Fachhochschule).

In Savosa there were a total of 317 students (as of 2009). The Ticino education system provides up to three years of non-mandatory kindergarten and in Savosa there were 59 children in kindergarten. The primary school program lasts for five years and includes both a standard school and a special school. In the municipality, 100 students attended the standard primary schools and 3 students attended the special school. In the lower secondary school system, students either attend a two-year middle school followed by a two-year pre-apprenticeship or they attend a four-year program to prepare for higher education. There were 72 students in the two-year middle school and 1 in their pre-apprenticeship, while 38 students were in the four-year advanced program.

The upper secondary school includes several options, but at the end of the upper secondary program, a student will be prepared to enter a trade or to continue on to a university or college. In Ticino, vocational students may either attend school while working on their internship or apprenticeship (which takes three or four years) or may attend school followed by an internship or apprenticeship (which takes one year as a full-time student or one and a half to two years as a part-time student). There were 17 vocational students who were attending school full-time and 21 who attend part-time.

The professional program lasts three years and prepares a student for a job in engineering, nursing, computer science, business, tourism and similar fields. There were 6 students in the professional program.

As of 2000, there were 609 students in Savosa who came from another municipality, while 147 residents attended schools outside the municipality.
