= Lago d'Origlio =

Lake in Ticino, Switzerland

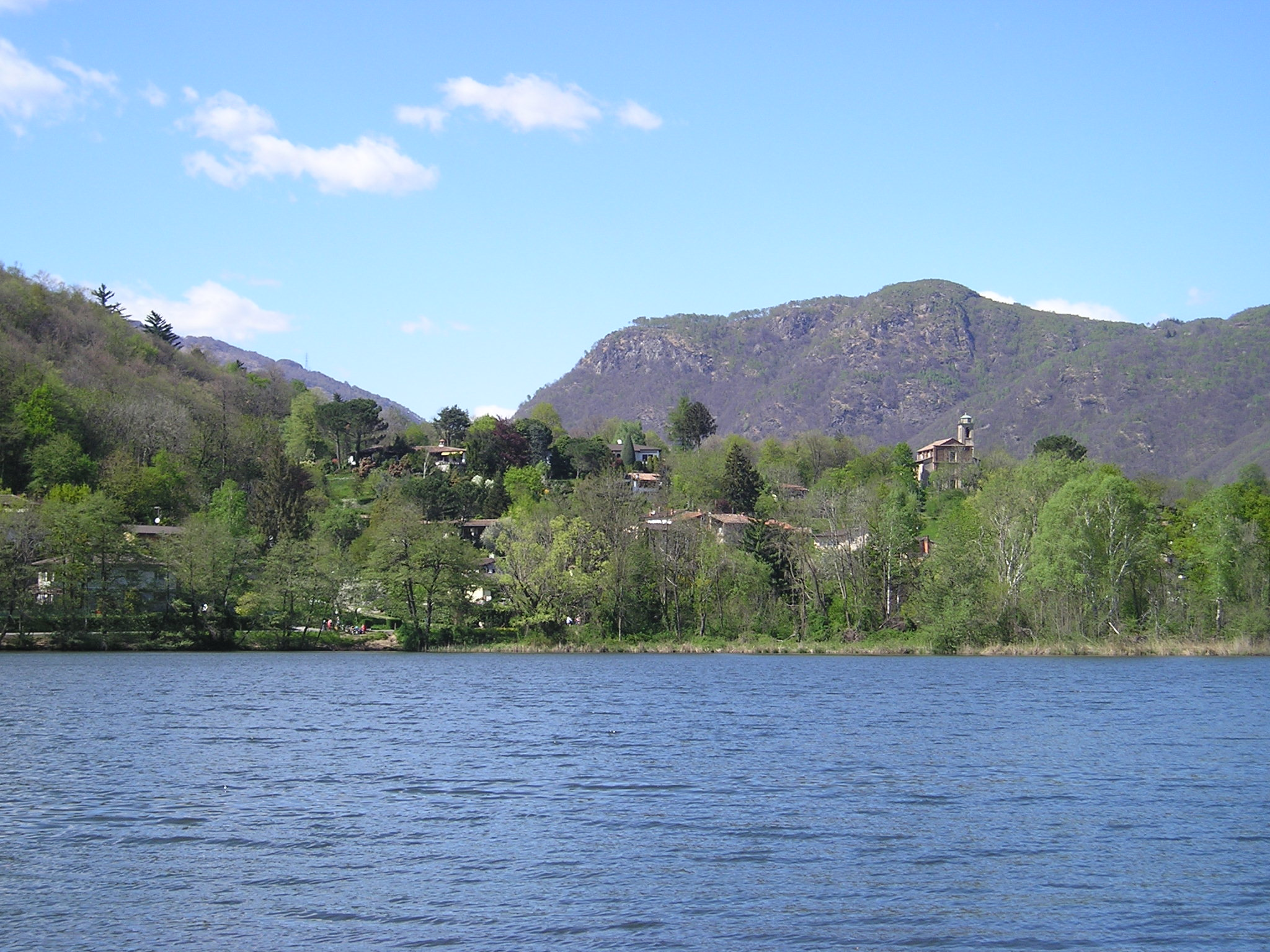

- Location within Canton of Ticino Location within Switzerland Location within Alps
- Interactive map of Lago d'Origlio
- Location: Origlio, Ticino
- Coordinates: 46°03′04″N 8°56′32″E
- Catchment area: 2 km^{2} (0.77 sq mi)
- Basin countries: Switzerland
- Surface area: 8 ha (20 acres)
- Max. depth: 5.35 m (17.6 ft)
- Surface elevation: 416 m (1,365 ft)

Lago d'Origlio is a lake in the municipality of Origlio, in Ticino, Switzerland.

The first agricultural activity occurred approximately 7,500 and 5,000 years ago, when people burned forests to clear land for farms and pastures. Palaeobotanics examined the core of the lake sediment and discovered deposits of charcoal, cereal pollen, and invasive weeds.
