= Lopagno =

Swiss Municipality

Coordinates: 46°4′6″N 8°58′38″E

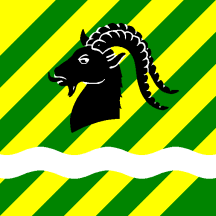
Flag of Lopagno

Lopagno is a village and former municipality in the canton of Ticino, Switzerland.

In 2001 the municipality was merged with the other, neighboring municipalities Cagiallo, Roveredo, Sala Capriasca, Tesserete and Vaglio to form a new and larger municipality Capriasca.

== History ==
Lopagno is first mentioned in 1335 as Lopagnio.

Lopagno, together with Cagiallo and Campestro, formed a Vicinanza since the Middle Ages. In the 16th and 17th centuries there were several large-scale emigrations from the village. The economy of the village was based on agriculture, trade and construction activities. The inhabitants of Lopagno were among the leaders of the popular uprising against the authorities of the Helvetic Republic on 26 January 1802. Since 1952, the Institute Don Orione for the care of the mentally disabled, is active in Lopagno.

The S. Apollonia chapel dates back to the 16th century, and is a dependent of the parish of Tesserete.

In 2000 about three quarters of the working population worked outside the village.

== Location ==
The village is located in the Capriasca valley at the entrance to Val Colla and includes the hamlets of Treggia, Somazzo and Oggio

== Historic population ==
The historical population is given in the following chart:
