= Origlio =

- Municipality
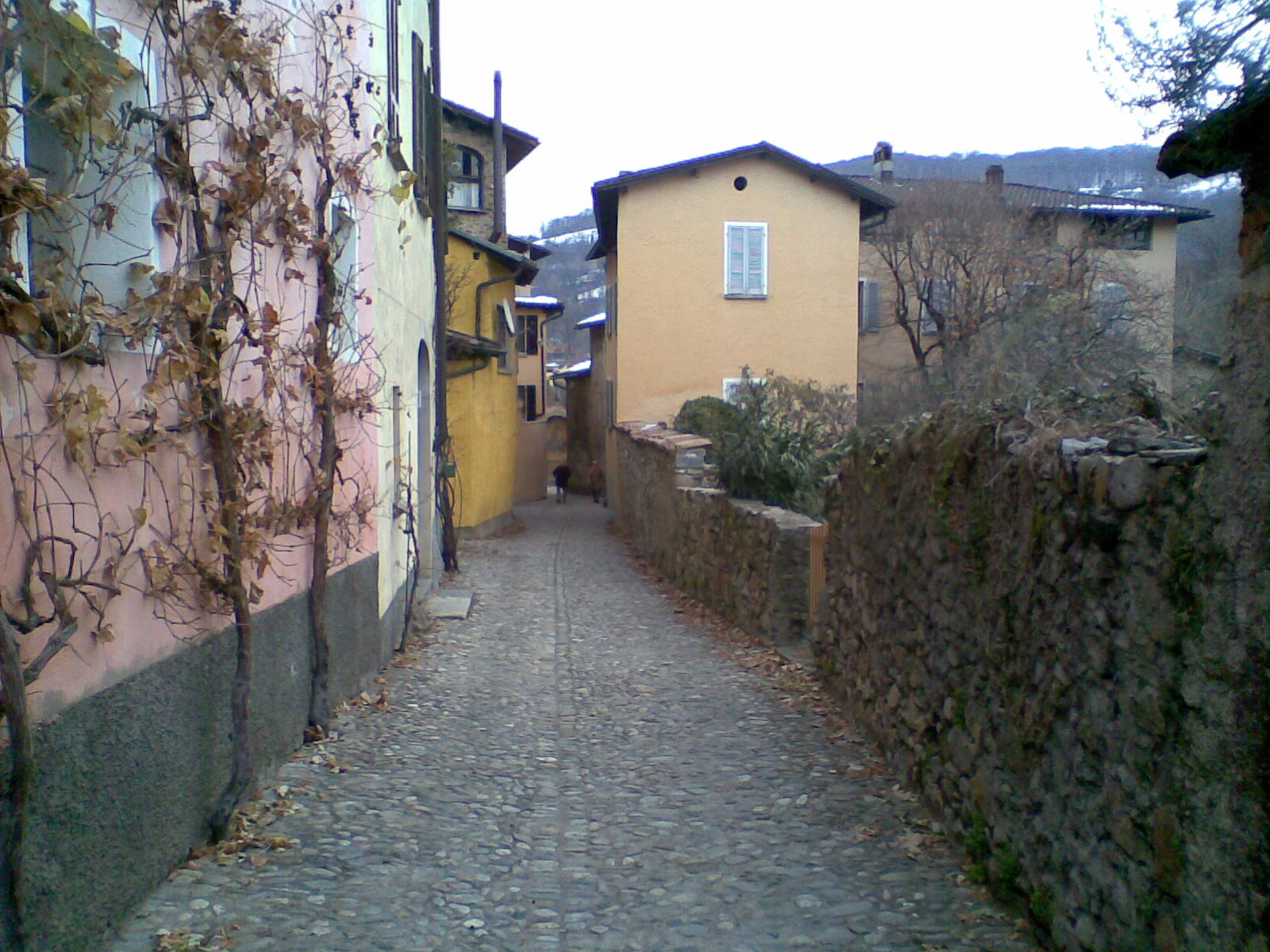
- Origlio village

- Flag Coat of arms
- Location of Origlio
- Location within Switzerland Location within Canton of Ticino
- Coordinates: 46°03′N 8°57′E
- Country: Switzerland
- Canton: Ticino
- District: Lugano

Government
  - Mayor: Sindaco

Area
  - Total: 2.07 km^{2} (0.80 sq mi)
- Elevation: 452 m (1,483 ft)

Population (December 2004)
  - Total: 1,239
  - Density: 599/km^{2} (1,550/sq mi)
- Time zone: UTC+01:00 (CET)
  - Summer (DST): UTC+02:00 (CEST)
- Postal code: 6945
- SFOS number: 5208
- ISO 3166 code: CH-TI
- Surrounded by: Capriasca, Comano, Cureglia, Lamone, Ponte Capriasca, Torricella-Taverne
- Website: www.origlio.ch

Origlio is a municipality in the district of Lugano in the canton of Ticino in Switzerland.

== History ==
Origlio is first mentioned in 1335 as Orellio.

In the Middle Ages, the village, was part of the valley community of Lugano. In 1484 it was ravaged by the plague. In the 15th century it was under the Duke of Milan, to whom it had to provide soldiers and weapons. Under Swiss Confederation rule, it was part of the bailiwick of Lugano. In 1803, after the Act of Mediation, it became part of the district of Lugano.

The first church in the village dates from the 8th century. The church of San Vittore Mauro in Carnago was built on the site of this earlier church. In 1570 it became a parish church. A duty was shared after 1812, with the church of SS Giorgio and Maria Immacolata, which dates back to the 17th century. Its interior contains a number of frescoes and stucco work.

The village economy was built around viticulture, silkworm breeding and farming. In the 1950s Orgilio developed into a residential and tourist center, which resulted in a population increase. By the 1980s the population had doubled.

== Geography ==
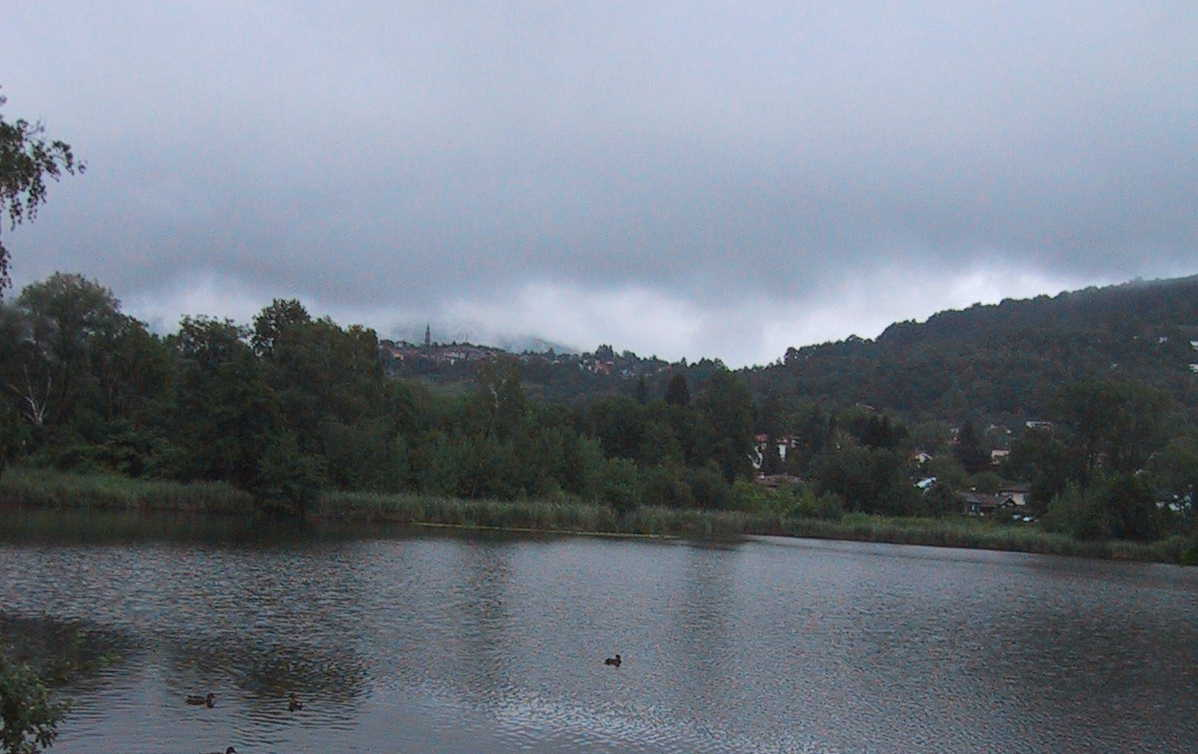
Lake Origlio

Origlio has an area, as of 1997, of 2.07 square kilometers (0.80 sq mi). Of this area, 0.56 km^{2} (0.22 sq mi) or 27.1% is used for agricultural purposes, while 1.25 km^{2} (0.48 sq mi) or 60.4% is forested. Of the rest of the land, 0.55 km^{2} (0.21 sq mi) or 26.6% is settled (buildings or roads), 0.07 km^{2} (17 acres) or 3.4% is either rivers or lakes and 0.04 km^{2} (9.9 acres) or 1.9% is unproductive land.

Of the built up area, housing and buildings made up 17.4% and transportation infrastructure made up 6.8%, while parks, green belts and sports fields made up 1.9%. Out of the forested land, 52.2% of the total land area is heavily forested and 8.2% is covered with orchards or small clusters of trees. Of the agricultural land, 7.2% is used for growing crops, while 2.4% is used for orchards or vine crops and 17.4% is used for alpine pastures. All the water in the municipality is in lakes.

The municipality is located in the Lugano district, in a glacially created depression near Lago di Origlio. It consists of the village of Origlio and the hamlet of Carnago.

== Demographics ==
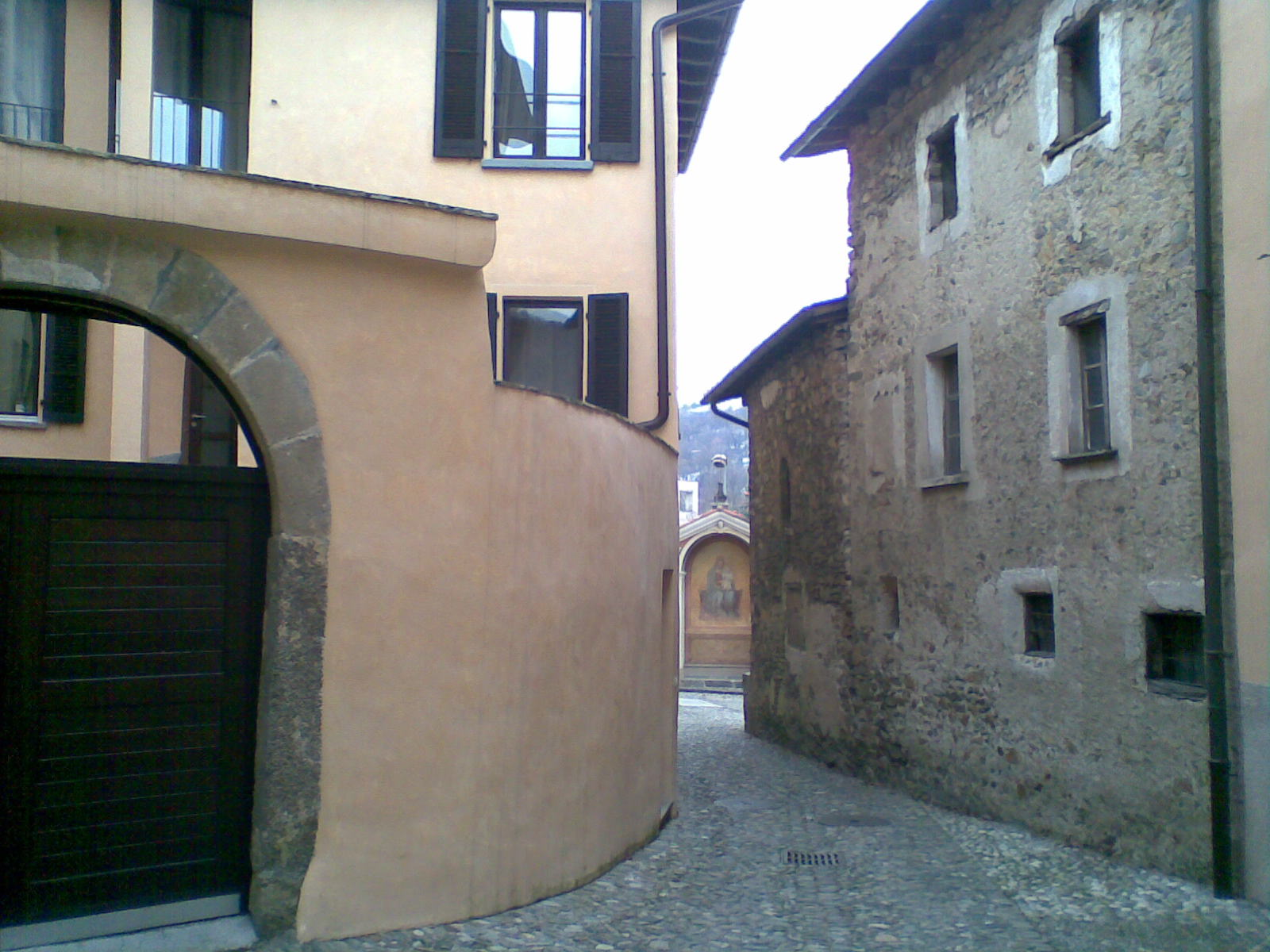
Houses in the historic center of Origlio

Origlio has a population (as of December 2020) of 1,497. As of 2008, 15.6% of the population are resident foreign nationals. Over the last 10 years (1997–2007) the population has changed at a rate of 14.5%.

Most of the population (as of 2000) speaks Italian (81.4%), with German being second most common (13.2%) and French being third (2.1%). Of the Swiss national languages (as of 2000), 153 speak German, 24 people speak French, 943 people speak Italian, and 2 people speak Romansh. The remainder (36 people) speak another language.

As of 2008, the gender distribution of the population was 48.0% male and 52.0% female. The population was made up of 542 Swiss men (39.6% of the population), and 114 (8.3%) non-Swiss men. There were 603 Swiss women (44.1%), and 108 (7.9%) non-Swiss women.

In 2008 there were 9 live births to Swiss citizens and were 7 deaths of Swiss citizens. Ignoring immigration and emigration, the population of Swiss citizens increased by 2 while the foreign population remained the same. There were 3 Swiss men who emigrated from Switzerland and 1 Swiss woman who immigrated back to Switzerland. At the same time, there were 3 non-Swiss men and 7 non-Swiss women who immigrated from another country to Switzerland. The total Swiss population change in 2008 (from all sources, including moves across municipal borders) was a decrease of 2 and the non-Swiss population change was an increase of 20 people. This represents a population growth rate of 1.4%.

The age distribution, as of 2009, in Origlio is; 135 children or 9.9% of the population are between 0 and 9 years old and 217 teenagers or 15.9% are between 10 and 19. Of the adult population, 129 people or 9.4% of the population are between 20 and 29 years old. 156 people or 11.4% are between 30 and 39, 271 people or 19.8% are between 40 and 49, and 186 people or 13.6% are between 50 and 59. The senior population distribution is 148 people or 10.8% of the population are between 60 and 69 years old, 73 people or 5.3% are between 70 and 79, there are 52 people or 3.8% who are over 80.

As of 2000, there were 462 private households in the municipality, and an average of 2.5 persons per household. In 2000 there were 333 single family homes (or 75.9% of the total) out of a total of 439 inhabited buildings. There were 58 two family buildings (13.2%) and 31 multi-family buildings (7.1%). There were also 17 buildings in the municipality that were multipurpose buildings (used for both housing and commercial or another purpose).

The vacancy rate for the municipality, in 2008, was 0%. In 2000 there were 600 apartments in the municipality. The most common apartment size was the 5 room apartment of which there were 198. There were 9 single room apartments and 198 apartments with five or more rooms. Of these apartments, a total of 460 apartments (76.7% of the total) were permanently occupied, while 133 apartments (22.2%) were seasonally occupied and 7 apartments (1.2%) were empty. As of 2007, the construction rate of new housing units was 4.5 new units per 1000 residents.

The historical population is given in the following chart:

== Sights ==
The entire village of Origlio is designated as part of the Inventory of Swiss Heritage Sites.

== Politics ==
In the 2007 federal election the most popular party was the FDP which received 28.38% of the vote. The next three most popular parties were the SP (21.61%), the Ticino League (18.91%) and the CVP (12.61%). In the federal election, a total of 467 votes were cast, and the voter turnout was 54.3%.

In the 2007 Gran Consiglio election, there were a total of 857 registered voters in Origlio, of which 538 or 62.8% voted. 14 blank ballots and 1 null ballot were cast, leaving 523 valid ballots in the election. The most popular party was the PLRT which received 136 or 26.0% of the vote. The next three most popular parties were; the LEGA (with 109 or 20.8%), the PS (with 97 or 18.5%) and the SSI (with 80 or 15.3%).

In the 2007 Consiglio di Stato election, 3 blank ballots and 3 null ballots were cast, leaving 532 valid ballots in the election. The most popular party was the LEGA which received 140 or 26.3% of the vote. The next three most popular parties were; the PLRT (with 131 or 24.6%), the PS (with 115 or 21.6%) and the SSI (with 74 or 13.9%).

== Economy ==
As of 2007, Origlio had an unemployment rate of 2.61%. As of 2005, there were 13 people employed in the primary economic sector and about 6 businesses involved in this sector. 9 people were employed in the secondary sector and there were 6 businesses in this sector. 96 people were employed in the tertiary sector, with 20 businesses in this sector. There were 532 residents of the municipality who were employed in some capacity, of which females made up 41.7% of the workforce.

In 2000, there were 153 workers who commuted into the municipality and 436 workers who commuted away. The municipality is a net exporter of workers, with about 2.8 workers leaving the municipality for every one entering. About 19.6% of the workforce coming into Origlio are coming from outside Switzerland. Of the working population, 6.8% used public transportation to get to work, and 70.7% used a private car.

As of 2009, there were 2 hotels in Origlio.

== Religion ==
From the 2000 census, 821 or 70.9% were Roman Catholic, while 138 or 11.9% belonged to the Swiss Reformed Church. There are 147 individuals (or about 12.69% of the population) who belong to another church (not listed on the census), and 52 individuals (or about 4.49% of the population) did not answer the question.

== Education ==
In Origlio about 84.4% of the population (between age 25 and 64) have completed either non-mandatory upper secondary education or additional higher education (either university or a Fachhochschule).

In Origlio there were a total of 286 students (as of 2009). The Ticino education system provides up to three years of non-mandatory kindergarten and in Origlio there were 36 children in kindergarten. The primary school program lasts for five years and includes both a standard school and a special school. In the municipality, 77 students attended the standard primary schools and 1 student attended the special school. In the lower secondary school system, students either attend a two-year middle school followed by a two-year pre-apprenticeship or they attend a four-year program to prepare for higher education. There were 86 students in the two-year middle school and 1 in their pre-apprenticeship, while 45 students were in the four-year advanced program.

The upper secondary school includes several options, but at the end of the upper secondary program, a student will be prepared to enter a trade or to continue on to a university or college. In Ticino, vocational students may either attend school while working on their internship or apprenticeship (which takes three or four years) or may attend school followed by an internship or apprenticeship (which takes one year as a full-time student or one and a half to two years as a part-time student). There were 17 vocational students who were attending school full-time and 21 who attend part-time.

The professional program lasts three years and prepares a student for a job in engineering, nursing, computer science, business, tourism and similar fields. There were 2 students in the professional program.

As of 2000, there were 149 students in Origlio who came from another municipality, while 212 residents attended schools outside the municipality.
