= Roveredo, Ticino =

Coordinates: 46°4′25″N 8°59′6″E

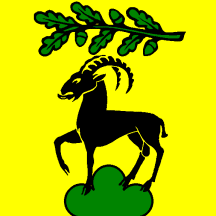
Flag

Roveredo is a village and former municipality in the canton of Ticino, Switzerland.

In 2001 the municipality was merged with the other, neighboring municipalities Cagiallo, Lopagno, Sala Capriasca, Tesserete and Vaglio to form a new and larger municipality Capriasca.

== Location ==
The village of Roveredo is located in the upper Capriasca valley on the right side of the entrance to the Val Colla.

== Historic population ==
The historical population is given in the following chart:
