= Bigorio Monastery =

Coordinates: 46.0752°N 8.95005°E

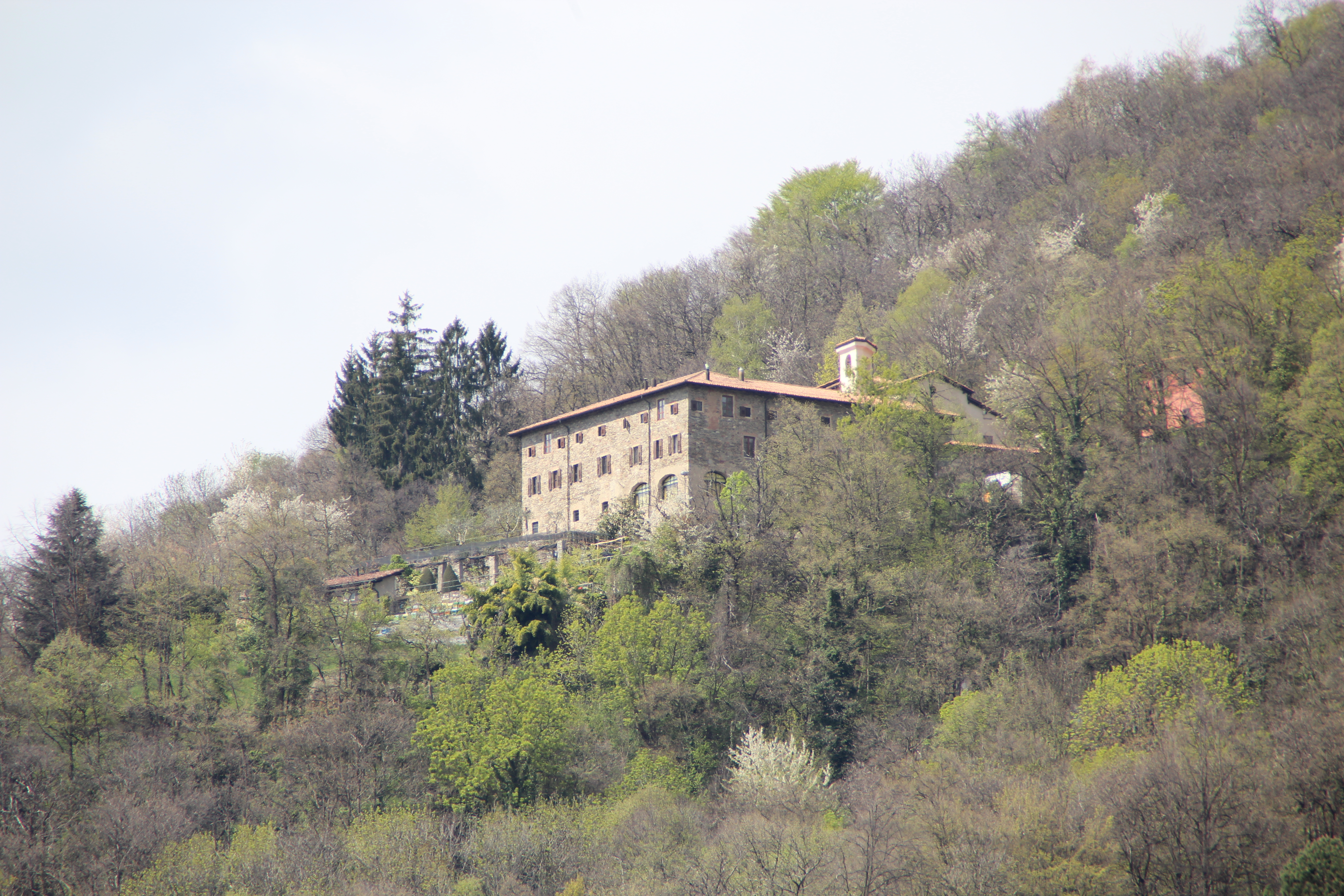
Bigorio Monastery

Bigorio Monastery (German: Kapuzinerkloster Bigorio, Italian: Convento di Santa Maria Assunta) is a Capuchin monastery in the village of Bigorio, in Capriasca, in the canton of Ticino, Switzerland. It was founded in 1535 as the first seat of the Capuchins in Switzerland.

== See also ==
- Inventory of Swiss Heritage Sites
- List of museums in Switzerland
