= Capriasca =

- Municipality
- Flag Coat of arms
- Location of Capriasca
- Location within Switzerland Location within Canton of Ticino
- Coordinates: 46°4′N 8°58′E
- Country: Switzerland
- Canton: Ticino
- District: Lugano

Government
  - Mayor: Francesco Canonica

Area
  - Total: 36.35 km^{2} (14.03 sq mi)
- Elevation: 529 m (1,736 ft)

Population (December 2004)
  - Total: 4,547
  - Density: 125.1/km^{2} (324.0/sq mi)
- Time zone: UTC+01:00 (CET)
  - Summer (DST): UTC+02:00 (CEST)
- Postal code: 6950
- SFOS number: 5226
- ISO 3166 code: CH-TI
- Localities: Cagiallo, Sarone, Almatro, Bettagno, Bidogno, San Matteo-Muralta, Lopagno, Lugaggia, Treggia, Somazzo, Oggio, Roveredo, Sala Capriasca, Tesserete, Vaglio
- Surrounded by: Comano, Isone, Lugano, Mezzovico-Vira, Monteceneri, Origlio, Ponte Capriasca.
- Website: www.capriasca.ch

Capriasca is a municipality in the district of Lugano in the canton of Ticino in Switzerland.

The municipality was created in 2001 by a merger of Cagiallo, Lopagno, Roveredo, Sala Capriasca, Tesserete and Vaglio.

== History ==
Cagiallo is first mentioned in the 13th Century as Guzallo. In 1335 it was mentioned as Cazallo. Sala Capriasca is first mentioned in 1078 as Sale. In 1467 it was mentioned as Salla. Lopagno is first mentioned in 1335 as Lopagnio. Roveredo is first mentioned in 1583 as Roveretro.

=== Cagiallo ===
Together with Lopagno and Campestro, Cagiallo formed a Bürgergemeinde from the Middle Ages through the modern era.

The late medieval church of S. Matteo was rebuilt 1672, but retained the romanesque clock tower. The village was part of the parish of Tesserete. The Chapel of St. Lucia is first mentioned in 1606, and the Chapel of St. Sebastian in Almatro was built in 1682.

The pre-industrial economy was based on agriculture and emigration. In the 18th and 19th Centuries, the Battaglini family played an important role throughout the valley. Cagiallo supports the tourist facilities and hotels of the village of Tesserete, and has become a suburb of it in recent years.

=== Sala Capriasca ===
Sala Capriasca was originally a Lombard walled village. In the 15th century, it formed a Vicinanza with Bigorio. In the first half of the 16th century, had rights to the commons in the parish of Capriasca. It was part of the Tesserete parish until 1933.

The parish church of St. Anthony was first mentioned in 1413. In the 15th and 16th Centuries it was totally rebuilt. The monastery of Bigorio was founded in 1535 as the first seat of the Capuchins in Switzerland.

Economically the village was dominated by agriculture and rural handicrafts. The traditional seasonal migration brought extra income. In the second half of the 20th century, it developed into a bedroom community. In 2000, four-fifths of the working population were commuters, especially to Lugano.

=== Lopagno ===
Lopagno, together with Cagiallo and Campestro, formed a Vicinanza since the Middle Ages. In the 16th and 17th Centuries there were several large-scale emigrations from the village. The economy of the village was based on agriculture, trade and construction activities. The inhabitants of Lopagno were among the leaders of the popular uprising against the authorities of the Helvetic Republic on 26 January 1802. Since 1952, the Institute Don Orione for the care of the mentally disabled, is active in Lopagno.

The S. Apollonia chapel dates back to the 16th century and is a dependent of the parish of Tesserete.

In 2000 about three-quarters of the working population worked outside the village.

=== Roveredo ===
Roveredo belonged to the Pieve of Capriasca and the parish church of Tesserete. The local Chapel of St. Bernard of Clairvaux was built in 1403.

Agriculture and pastoralism were once the main sources of income. Starting in the 1960s, Roveredo developed into a residential community, due to its proximity to Lugano and Tesserete. In 2000, approximately four-fifths of the workforce in Roveredo commutes.

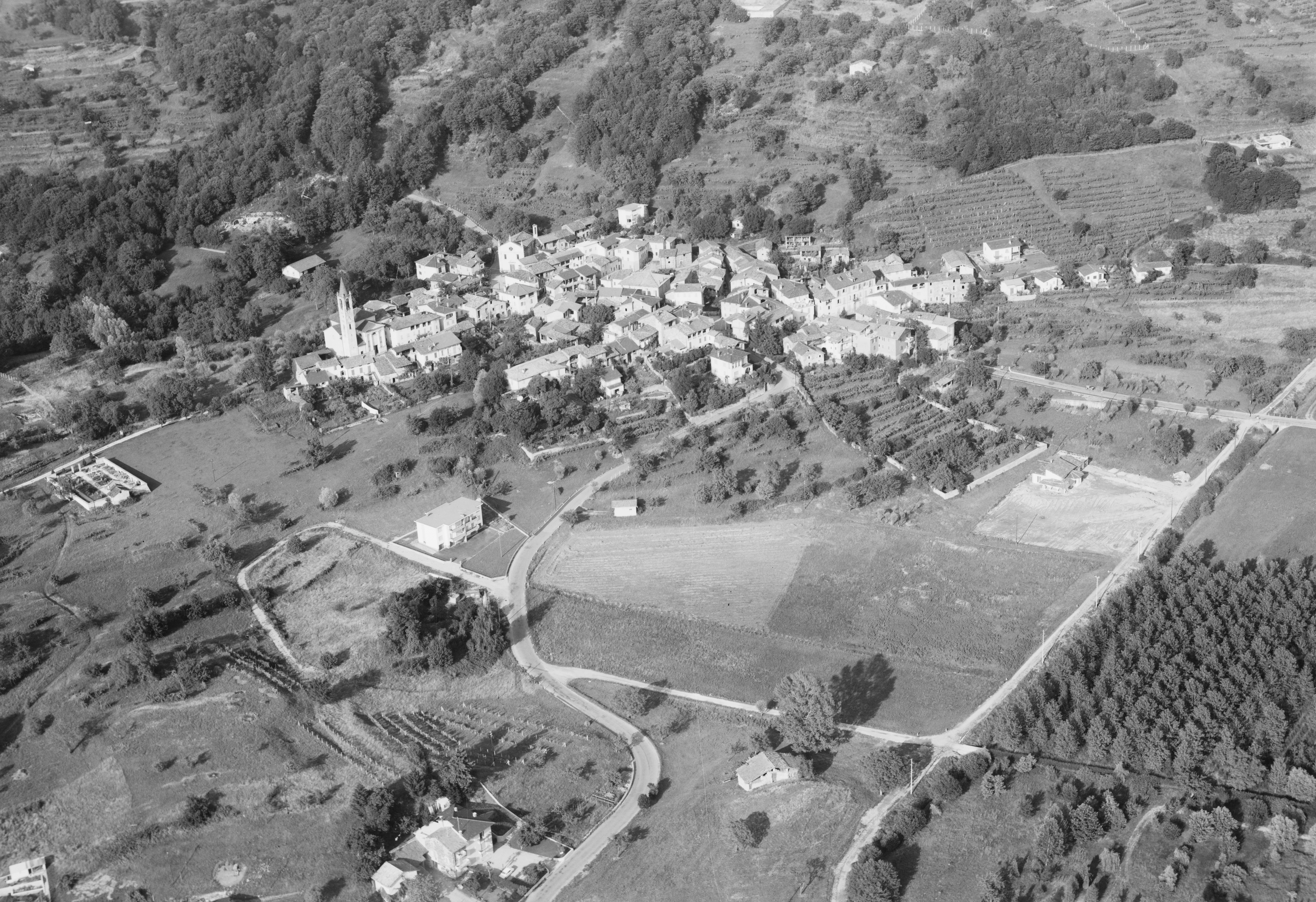
Aerial view (1964)

== Geography ==
Capriasca has an area, as of 1997, of 36.35 square kilometers (14.03 sq mi). Of this area, 0.36 km^{2} (0.14 sq mi) or 1.0% is used for agricultural purposes, while 2.14 km^{2} (0.83 sq mi) or 5.9% is forested. Of the rest of the land, 0.41 km^{2} (0.16 sq mi) or 1.1% is settled (buildings or roads) and 0.08 km^{2} (20 acres) or 0.2% is unproductive land.

Of the built up area, housing and buildings made up 0.8% and transportation infrastructure made up 0.2%. Out of the forested land, all of the forested land area is covered with heavy forests. Of the agricultural land, 0.2% is used for growing crops.

Cagiallo village also contained the settlements of Sarone, Almatro, Bettagno and San Matteo-Muralta. The village of Sala Capriasca is located in the Capriasca valley at the foot of Mount Bigorio and includes the settlements of Sala, Bigorio, Lelgio and Pezzolo. The village of Lopagno is located in the Capriasca valley at the entrance to Val Colla and includes the hamlets of Treggia, Somazzo and Oggio. The village of Roveredo is located in the upper Capriasca valley on the right side of the entrance to the Val Colla.

== Demographics ==
Capriasca has a population (as of December 2020) of 6,755. As of 2008, 10.0% of the population are resident foreign nationals. As of 2008, the gender distribution of the population was 49.6% male and 50.4% female. The population was made up of 2,765 Swiss men (44.1% of the population), and 347 (5.5%) non-Swiss men. There were 2,874 Swiss women (45.8%), and 288 (4.6%) non-Swiss women.

In 2008 there were 50 live births to Swiss citizens and 7 births to non-Swiss citizens, and in same time span there were 58 deaths of Swiss citizens and 3 non-Swiss citizen deaths. Ignoring immigration and emigration, the population of Swiss citizens decreased by 8 while the foreign population increased by 4. There were 16 Swiss men and 6 Swiss women who immigrated back to Switzerland. At the same time, there were 13 non-Swiss men and 14 non-Swiss women who immigrated from another country to Switzerland. The total Swiss population change in 2008 (from all sources, including moves across municipal borders) was an increase of 90 and the non-Swiss population change was an increase of 49 people. This represents a population growth rate of 2.3%.

The age distribution, as of 2009, in Capriasca is; 664 children or 10.6% of the population are between 0 and 9 years old and 694 teenagers or 11.1% are between 10 and 19. Of the adult population, 607 people or 9.7% of the population are between 20 and 29 years old. 815 people or 13.0% are between 30 and 39, 1,101 people or 17.5% are between 40 and 49, and 922 people or 14.7% are between 50 and 59. The senior population distribution is 728 people or 11.6% of the population are between 60 and 69 years old, 459 people or 7.3% are between 70 and 79, there are 284 people or 4.5% who are over 80.

== Historic population ==
The historical population is given in the following timeline:

== Politics ==
In the 2007 federal election the most popular party was the CVP which received 25.87% of the vote. The next three most popular parties were the FDP (22.35%), the SP (19.08%) and the Ticino League (15.1%). In the federal election, a total of 1,708 votes were cast, and the voter turnout was 49.2%.

In the 2007 Gran Consiglio election, there were a total of 3,471 registered voters in Capriasca, of which 2,208 or 63.6% voted. 26 blank ballots and 5 null ballots were cast, leaving 2,177 valid ballots in the election. The most popular party was the PLRT which received 451 or 20.7% of the vote. The next three most popular parties were; the PPD+GenGiova (with 414 or 19.0%), the SSI (with 362 or 16.6%) and the PS (with 361 or 16.6%).

In the 2007 Consiglio di Stato election, 18 blank ballots and 9 null ballots were cast, leaving 2,182 valid ballots in the election. The most popular party was the LEGA which received 505 or 23.1% of the vote. The next three most popular parties were; the PS (with 434 or 19.9%), the PLRT (with 429 or 19.7%) and the PPD (with 423 or 19.4%).

== Education ==
In Capriasca there were a total of 1,133 students (as of 2009). The Ticino education system provides up to three years of non-mandatory kindergarten and in Capriasca there were 193 children in kindergarten. The primary school program lasts for five years and includes both a standard school and a special school. In the municipality, 323 students attended the standard primary schools and 11 students attended the special school. In the lower secondary school system, students either attend a two-year middle school followed by a two-year pre-apprenticeship or they attend a four-year program to prepare for higher education. There were 280 students in the two-year middle school, while 136 students were in the four-year advanced program.

The upper secondary school includes several options, but at the end of the upper secondary program, a student will be prepared to enter a trade or to continue on to a university or college. In Ticino, vocational students may either attend school while working on their internship or apprenticeship (which takes three or four years) or may attend school followed by an internship or apprenticeship (which takes one year as a full-time student or one and a half to two years as a part-time student). There were 67 vocational students who were attending school full-time and 114 who attend part-time.

The professional program lasts three years and prepares a student for a job in engineering, nursing, computer science, business, tourism and similar fields. There were 9 students in the professional program.

As of 2000, there were 416 students in Capriasca who came from another municipality, while 99 residents attended schools outside the municipality.

== Economy ==
There were 590 residents of the municipality who were employed in some capacity, of which females made up 42.2% of the workforce. In 2000, there were 432 workers who commuted into the municipality and 442 workers who commuted away. The municipality is a net exporter of workers, with about 1.0 workers leaving the municipality for every one entering. About 10.0% of the workforce coming into Capriasca are coming from outside Switzerland.

As of 2009, there were 7 hotels in Capriasca with a total of 48 rooms and 103 beds.

== Notable people ==
- Alfonsina Storni (1892–1938), poet
