= Stammheim =

Stammheim may refer to:

- Stammheim (film), a 1986 West German film directed by Reinhard Hauff
- Stammheim, Cologne, a municipal part of the city of Cologne, Germany
- Stuttgart-Stammheim, a municipal part of the city of Stuttgart, Germany
  - Stammheim Prison, a high security prison north of Stuttgart, Germany
- Stammheim, Florstadt, a district of Florstadt, Germany
- Stammheim, Calw, a district of Calw, Germany
- The municipality of Stammheim, Zurich in the canton of Zurich, Switzerland
  - The villages of Oberstammheim and Unterstammheim which form Stammheim
  - Stammheim railway station, shared between Oberstammheim and Unterstammheim
