= Schlatt, Thurgau =

Schlatt
- Municipality
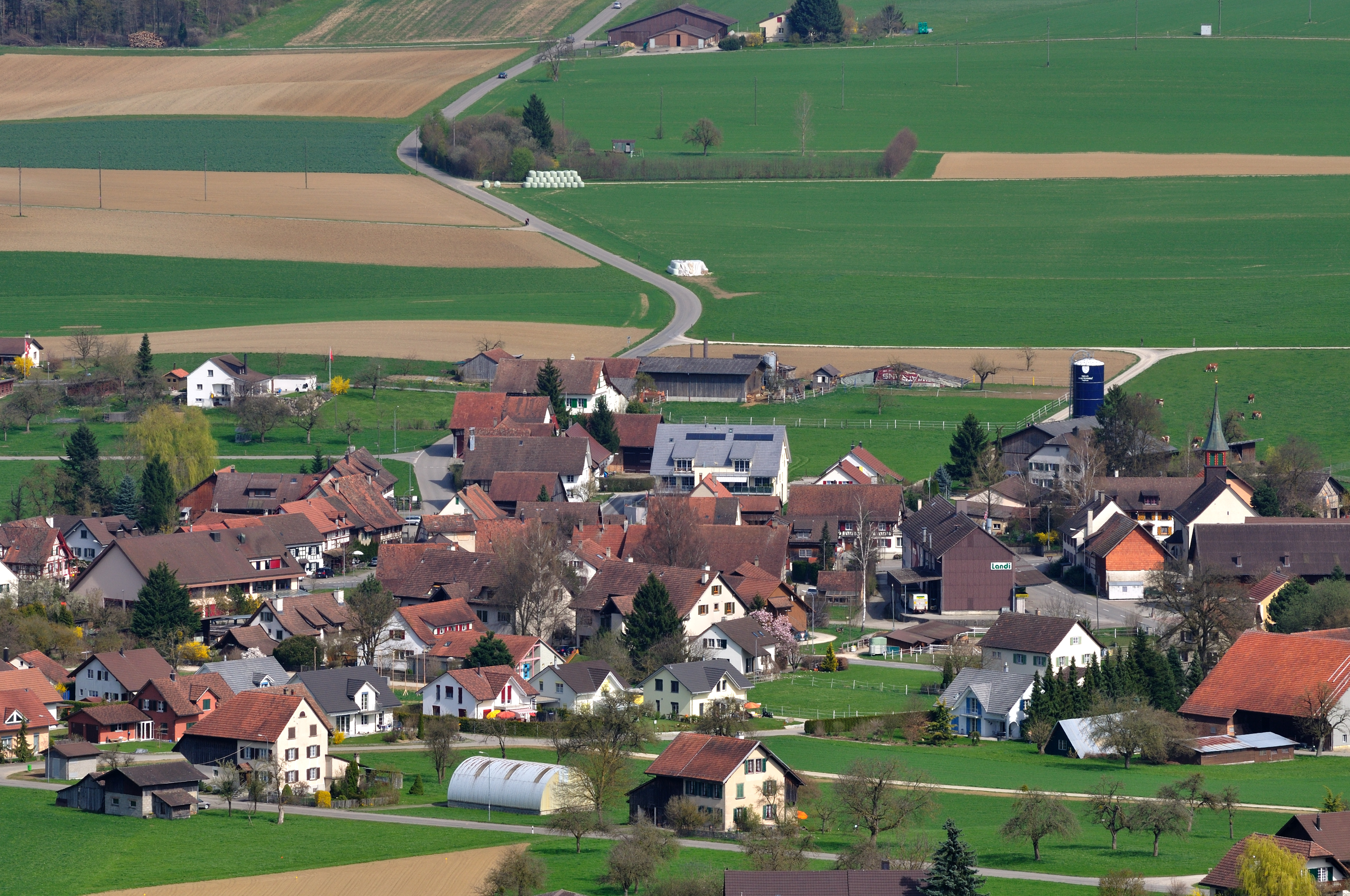

- Coat of arms
- Location of Schlatt
- Location within Switzerland Location within Canton of Thurgau
- Coordinates: 47°39′N 8°42′E
- Country: Switzerland
- Canton: Thurgau
- District: Frauenfeld

Area
  - Total: 15.5 km^{2} (6.0 sq mi)
- Elevation: 416 m (1,365 ft)

Population (December 2007)
  - Total: 1,574
  - Density: 102/km^{2} (263/sq mi)
- Time zone: UTC+01:00 (CET)
  - Summer (DST): UTC+02:00 (CEST)
- Postal code: 8252
- SFOS number: 4546
- ISO 3166 code: CH-TG
- Surrounded by: Basadingen-Schlattingen, Büsingen am Hochrhein (DE-BW), Laufen-Uhwiesen (ZH), Diessenhofen, Feuerthalen (ZH), Trüllikon (ZH), Truttikon (ZH)
- Website: www.schlatt.ch

Schlatt (or sometimes Schlatt TG in order to distinguish it from others) is a municipality in Frauenfeld District in the canton of Thurgau in Switzerland.

== History ==
Schlatt is first mentioned in 858 as Slate. In the Middle Ages, the House of Kyburg (subsequently House of Habsburg) bailiwick of Diessenhofen had jurisdiction over Schlatt. In the 15th century, the town of Diessenhofen became mostly independent and took over the jurisdiction of Schlatt. It exercised this right until 1798. The major landowner before 858 was the Abbey of St. Gall, then after 858 Rheinau Abbey acquired the land. In the 13th century, the monastery of St. Katharinental, along with others, held most of the land in the village. The St Nicholas Chapel, which existed from 1316 until 1812, belonged to Stammheim parish (today Oberstammheim and Unterstammheim). The Protestant Reformation of 1529 created an independent parish of Schlatt, which had no pastor of its own until 1769. In the late 16th century the pastor was provided by Basadingen, and he was provided by Diessenhofen from 1625 to 1631.

== Geography ==
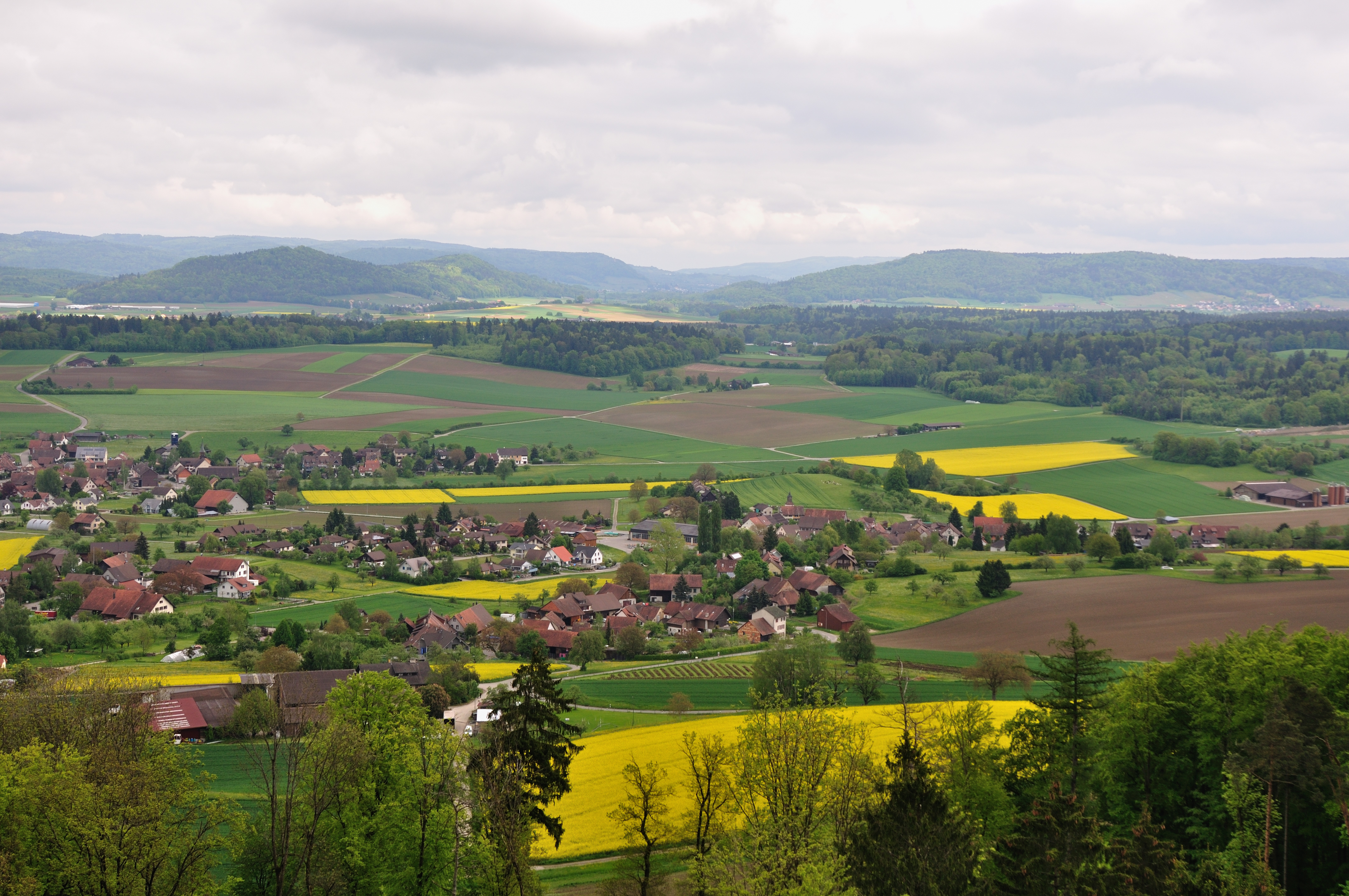
View over Schlatt from the Wildensbuch tower in the Canton of Zurich

Schlatt has an area, as of 2009, of 15.53 square kilometers (6.00 sq mi). Of this area, 7.81 km^{2} (3.02 sq mi) or 50.3% is used for agricultural purposes, while 5.76 km^{2} (2.22 sq mi) or 37.1% is forested. Of the rest of the land, 1.41 km^{2} (0.54 sq mi) or 9.1% is settled (buildings or roads), 0.32 km^{2} (0.12 sq mi) or 2.1% is either rivers or lakes and 0.18 km^{2} (0.069 sq mi) or 1.2% is unproductive land.

Of the built up area, industrial buildings made up 3.3% of the total area while housing and buildings made up 1.0% and transportation infrastructure made up 1.0%. while parks, green belts and sports fields made up 3.6%. Out of the forested land, 36.0% of the total land area is heavily forested and 1.1% is covered with orchards or small clusters of trees. Of the agricultural land, 49.1% is used for growing crops, while 1.2% is used for orchards or vine crops. All the water in the municipality is flowing water.

The municipality is located on the eastern slope of the Kohlfirst mountain. It was formed in 1999 through the merger of Mett-Oberschlatt and Unterschlatt.

Schlatt also shares an international border on the river Rhine with the German municipality of Büsingen am Hochrhein which is an enclave entirely surrounded by Swiss territory.

== Demographics ==
Schlatt has a population (as of December 2020) of 1,814. As of 2008, 8.8% of the population are foreign nationals. Most of the population (as of 2000) speaks German (95.8%), with French being second most common ( 0.7%) and Italian being third ( 0.7%).

As of 2008, the gender distribution of the population was 50.6% male and 49.4% female. The population was made up of 713 Swiss men (45.4% of the population), and 82 (5.2%) non-Swiss men. There were 721 Swiss women (45.9%), and 56 (3.6%) non-Swiss women.

In 2008 there were 14 live births to Swiss citizens and 2 births to non-Swiss citizens, and in same time span there were 10 deaths of Swiss citizens and 1 non-Swiss citizen death. Ignoring immigration and emigration, the population of Swiss citizens increased by 4 while the foreign population increased by 1. There were 1 Swiss woman who emigrated from Switzerland to another country, 3 non-Swiss men who emigrated from Switzerland to another country and 1 non-Swiss woman who emigrated from Switzerland to another country. The total Swiss population change in 2008 (from all sources) was an increase of 1 and the non-Swiss population change was an increase of 7 people. This represents a population growth rate of 0.5%.

The age distribution, as of 2009, in Schlatt is; 159 children or 9.9% of the population are between 0 and 9 years old and 235 teenagers or 14.7% are between 10 and 19. Of the adult population, 151 people or 9.4% of the population are between 20 and 29 years old. 205 people or 12.8% are between 30 and 39, 304 people or 19.0% are between 40 and 49, and 230 people or 14.4% are between 50 and 59. The senior population distribution is 164 people or 10.2% of the population are between 60 and 69 years old, 96 people or 6.0% are between 70 and 79, there are 47 people or 2.9% who are between 80 and 89, and there are 10 people or 0.6% who are 90 and older.

As of 2000, there were 562 private households in the municipality, and an average of 2.6 persons per household. In 2000 there were 324 single family homes (or 90.0% of the total) out of a total of 360 inhabited buildings. There were 13 two family buildings (3.6%), 5 three family buildings (1.4%) and 18 multi-family buildings (or 5.0%). There were 366 (or 24.6%) persons who were part of a couple without children, and 868 (or 58.5%) who were part of a couple with children. There were 80 (or 5.4%) people who lived in single parent home, while there are 8 persons who were adult children living with one or both parents, 6 persons who lived in a household made up of relatives, 12 who lived in a household made up of unrelated persons, and 14 who are either institutionalized or live in another type of collective housing.

The vacancy rate for the municipality, in 2008, was 2.69%. As of 2007, the construction rate of new housing units was 4.5 new units per 1000 residents. In 2000 there were 600 apartments in the municipality. The most common apartment size was the 5 room apartment of which there were 192. There were 6 single room apartments and 109 apartments with six or more rooms.

In the 2007 federal election the most popular party was the SVP which received 54.05% of the vote. The next three most popular parties were the SP (9.98%), the FDP (9.34%) and the CVP (8.72%). In the federal election, a total of 575 votes were cast, and the voter turnout was 52.0%.

The historical population of the former municipality of Mett-Oberschlatt (Unterschlatt is not listed) and the total population of the combined municipality (both before and after the actual merger) is given in the following table:

year	population Mett-Oberschlatt	population Future municipal area
1800	203	
1850	287	
1870	332	
1900	257	
1950	317	1,231
1980		939
1990	326	1,241
Year	Population	
2000	1,485	

== Heritage sites of national significance ==
The former Poor Clares Monastery of Paradies in Unterschlatt, the Schaarenwald (a Bronze Age settlement, Roman watchtower and early modern fortification) and the Double Farm House are listed as Swiss heritage sites of national significance. The entire hamlet of Dickihof and Paradies Monastery are included in the Inventory of Swiss Heritage Sites.

== Economy ==
As of 2007, Schlatt had an unemployment rate of 1.55%. As of 2005, there were 107 people employed in the primary economic sector and about 36 businesses involved in this sector. 145 people are employed in the secondary sector and there are 29 businesses in this sector. 209 people are employed in the tertiary sector, with 51 businesses in this sector.

In 2000 there were 1,019 workers who lived in the municipality. Of these, 534 or about 52.4% of the residents worked outside Schlatt while 221 people commuted into the municipality for work. There were a total of 706 jobs (of at least 6 hours per week) in the municipality. Of the working population, 10.7% used public transportation to get to work, and 54.2% used a private car.

== Religion ==
From the 2000 census, 261 or 17.6% were Roman Catholic, while 924 or 62.2% belonged to the Swiss Reformed Church. 11 people (about 0.7% of the population) belong to the Orthodox Church, and 57 people (about 3.8%) belong to another Christian church.

== Education ==
In Schlatt around 78% of the population (between age 25–64) have completed either non-mandatory upper secondary education or additional higher education (either university or a Fachhochschule).

== See also ==
- Schlatt railway station
