= Truttikon =

- Municipality
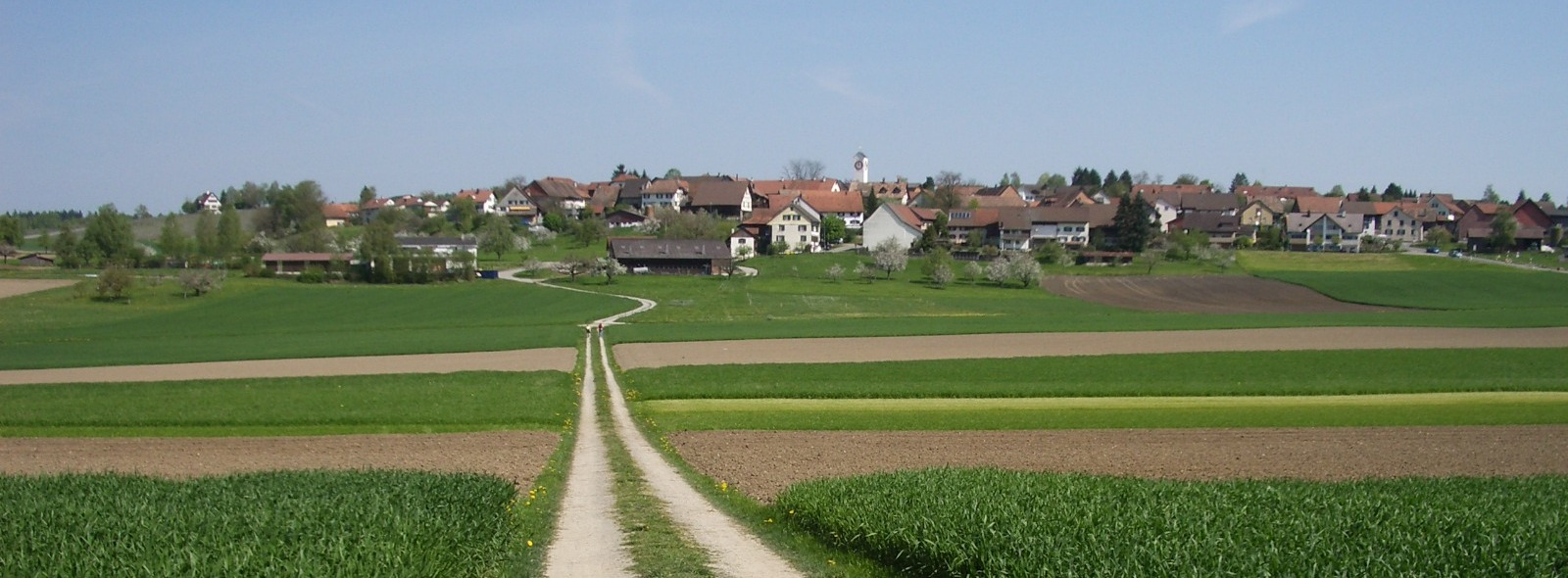

- Flag Coat of arms
- Location of Truttikon
- Location within Switzerland Location within Canton of Zurich
- Coordinates: 47°38′N 8°44′E
- Country: Switzerland
- Canton: Zurich
- District: Andelfingen

Area
  - Total: 4.42 km^{2} (1.71 sq mi)
- Elevation: 465 m (1,526 ft)

Population (December 2020)
  - Total: 449
  - Density: 102/km^{2} (263/sq mi)
- Time zone: UTC+01:00 (CET)
  - Summer (DST): UTC+02:00 (CEST)
- Postal code: 8467
- SFOS number: 41
- ISO 3166 code: CH-ZH
- Localities: Burghof, Gisenhard, Hausen bei Ossingen, Langenmoos
- Surrounded by: Basadingen-Schlattingen (TG), Ossingen, Schlatt (TG), Trüllikon, Waltalingen
- Website: www.truttikon.ch

Truttikon is a municipality in the district of Andelfingen in the canton of Zürich in Switzerland.

== Geography ==
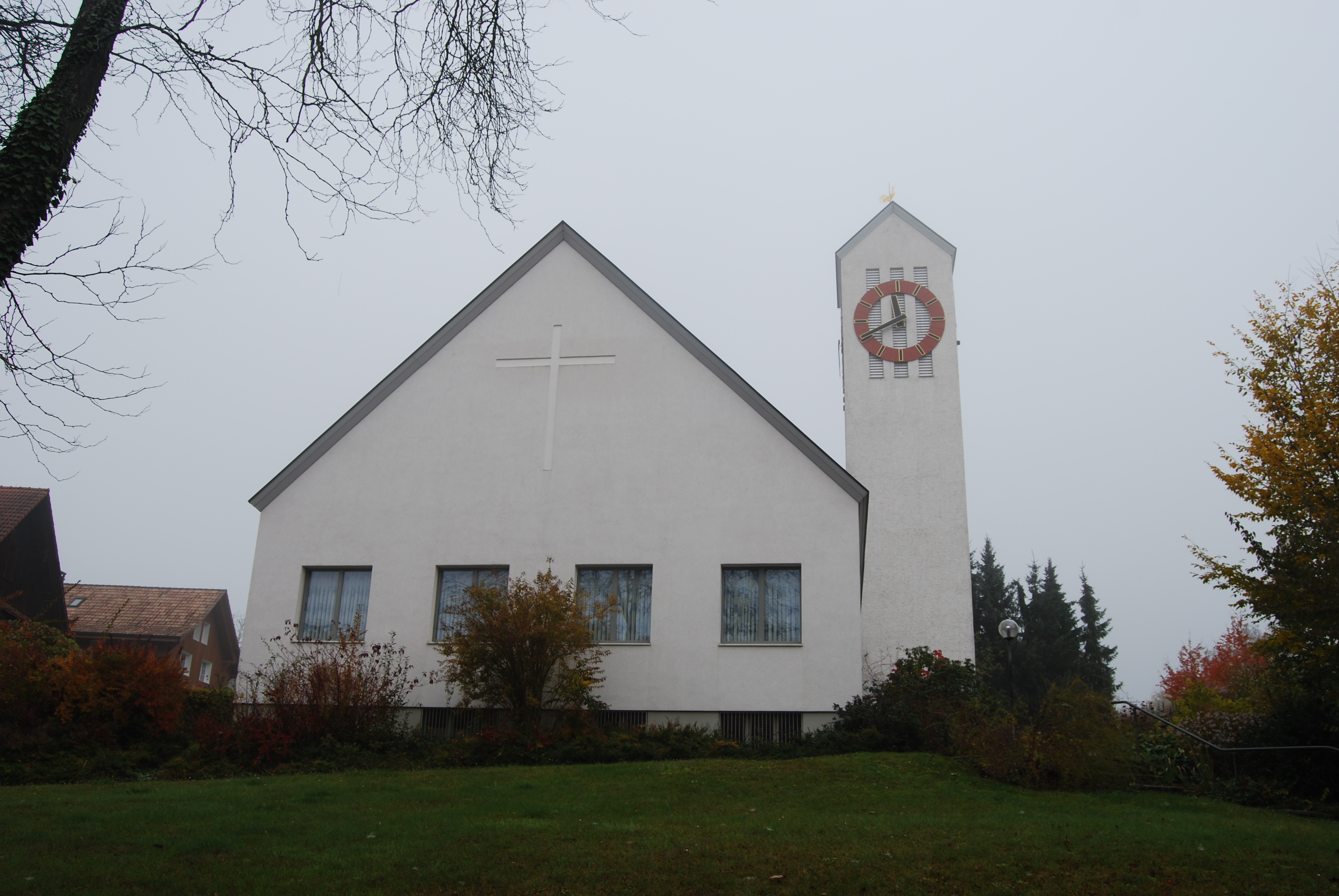
Church of Truttikon

Aerial view (1964)

Truttikon has an area of 4.4 km^{2} (1.7 sq mi). Of this area, 64.2% is used for agricultural purposes, while 28.4% is forested. Of the rest of the land, 7% is settled (buildings or roads) and the remainder (0.5%) is non-productive (rivers, glaciers or mountains).

== Demographics ==
Truttikon has a population (as of 31 December 2020) of 449. As of 2007, 3.2% of the population was made up of foreign nationals. Over the last 10 years the population has grown at a rate of 13.2%. Most of the population (as of 2000) speaks German (95.9%), with English being second most common ( 1.4%) and Italian being third ( 0.5%).

In the 2007 election the most popular party was the SVP which received 41.5% of the vote. The next three most popular parties were the local small left-wing parties (15.7%), the SPS (15.5%) and the FDP (8.8%).

The age distribution of the population (as of 2000) is children and teenagers (0–19 years old) make up 29.7% of the population, while adults (20–64 years old) make up 58.9% and seniors (over 64 years old) make up 11.5%. In Truttikon about 86.3% of the population (between age 25-64) have completed either non-mandatory upper secondary education or additional higher education (either university or a Fachhochschule).

Truttikon has an unemployment rate of 0.77%. As of 2005, there were 71 people employed in the primary economic sector and about 22 businesses involved in this sector. 16 people are employed in the secondary sector and there are 5 businesses in this sector. 22 people are employed in the tertiary sector, with 8 businesses in this sector.
