= Marthalen =

- Municipality
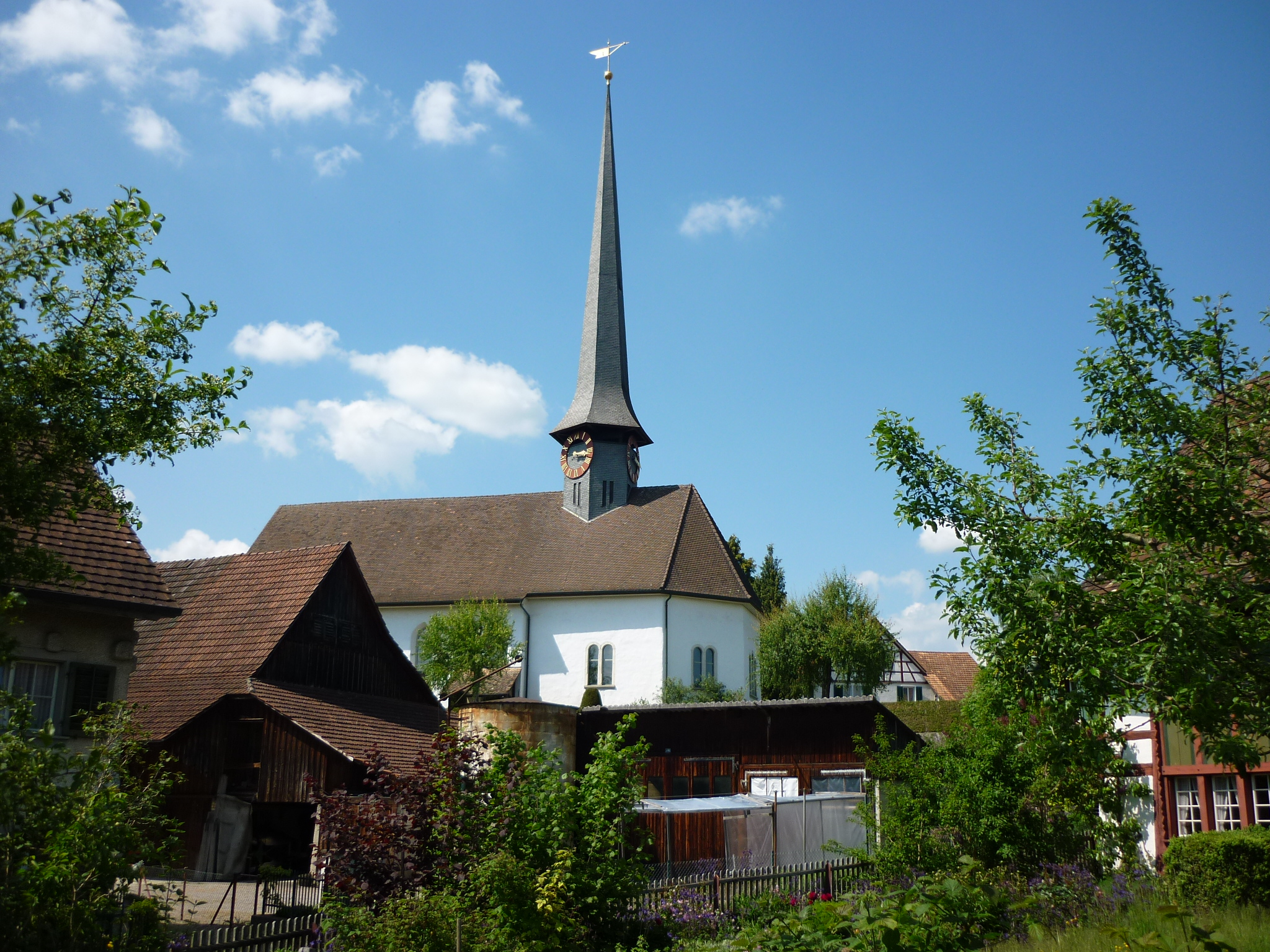

- Flag Coat of arms
- Location of Marthalen
- Location within Switzerland Location within Canton of Zurich
- Coordinates: 47°38′N 8°39′E
- Country: Switzerland
- Canton: Zurich
- District: Andelfingen

Area
  - Total: 14.11 km^{2} (5.45 sq mi)
- Elevation: 457 m (1,499 ft)

Population (December 2020)
  - Total: 1,933
  - Density: 137.0/km^{2} (354.8/sq mi)
- Time zone: UTC+01:00 (CET)
  - Summer (DST): UTC+02:00 (CEST)
- Postal code: 8460
- SFOS number: 35
- ISO 3166 code: CH-ZH
- Surrounded by: Benken, Buchberg (SH), Flaach, Kleinandelfingen, Lottstetten (DE-BW), Rheinau, Rüdlingen (SH), Trüllikon
- Website: www.marthalen.ch

Marthalen is a municipality in the district of Andelfingen in the canton of Zürich in Switzerland.

== History ==
Marthalen is first mentioned in 858 as Martella.

== Geography ==
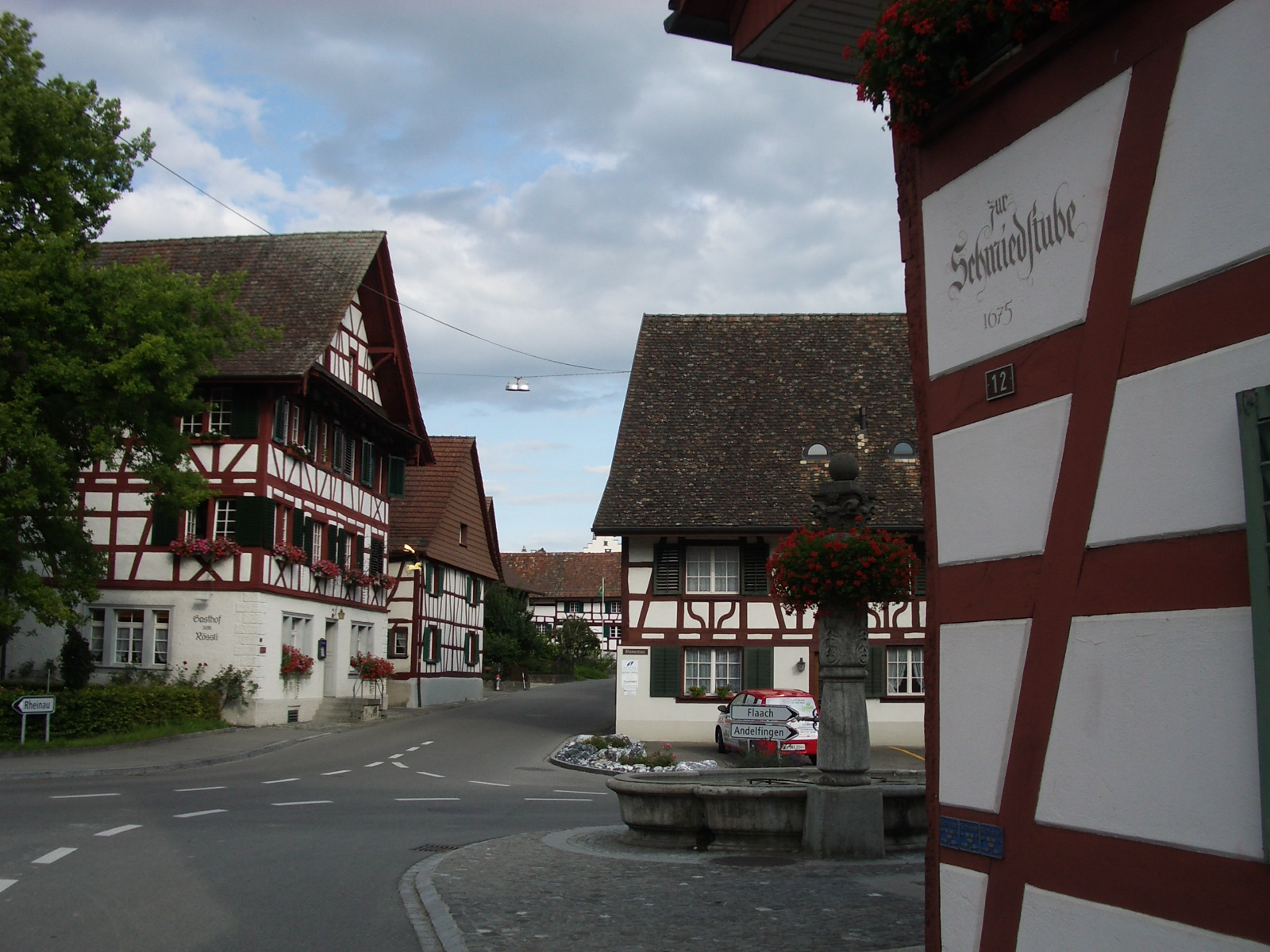
Several half-timbered houses in Marthalen

Aerial view from 400 m by Walter Mittelholzer (1923)

Marthalen has an area of 14.2 km^{2} (5.5 sq mi). Of this area, 49.3% is used for agricultural purposes, while 39.4% is forested. Of the rest of the land, 10% is settled (buildings or roads) and the remainder (1.3%) is non-productive (rivers, glaciers or mountains).

The municipality is located in the Zürcher Weinland (Zurich's vineyards) between the Thur and Rhine Rivers. The village is known for its half-timbered houses. The municipality also includes the village of Ellikon am Rhein, and the hamlets of Niedermarthalen and Radhof.

== Demographics ==
Marthalen has a population (as of 31 December 2020) of 1,933. As of 2007, 7.5% of the population was made up of foreign nationals. Over the last 10 years the population has grown at a rate of 5.1%. Most of the population (as of 2000) speaks German (95.6%), with French (0.6%) and Italian being third (0.6%) most common languages.

In the 2007 election the most popular party was the SVP, which received 54.3% of the vote. The next three most popular parties were the SPS (11.5%), the Green Party (10.3%), and the CSP (9.4%).

The age distribution of the population (as of 2000) is children and teenagers (0–19 years old) make up 25.7% of the population, while adults (20–64 years old), make up 59.9% and seniors (over 64 years old) make up 14.4%. In Marthalen about 81.3% of the population (between age 25-64) have completed either non-mandatory upper secondary education or additional higher education (either university or a Fachhochschule).

Marthalen has an unemployment rate of 0.87%. As of 2005, there were 110 people employed in the primary economic sector and about 39 businesses involved in this sector. 231 people are employed in the secondary sector and there are 37 businesses in this sector. 453 people are employed in the tertiary sector, with 62 businesses in this sector. The historical population is given in the following table:

| year | population |
|---|---|
| 1464 | 27 Households^{a} |
| 1649 | 862 |
| 1771 | 1,012 |
| 1850 | 1,401 |
| 1900 | 1,164 |
| 1920 | 1,296 |
| 1950 | 1,215 |
| 1980 | 1,259 |
| 2000 | 1,803 |

^a Ellikon is not included in the number of households.

== Transport ==
Marthalen railway station is a stop of the S-Bahn Zürich on the line S33.

== Buildings and structures ==
- Marthalen Landi-Silo
