= Waltalingen =

- Former municipality
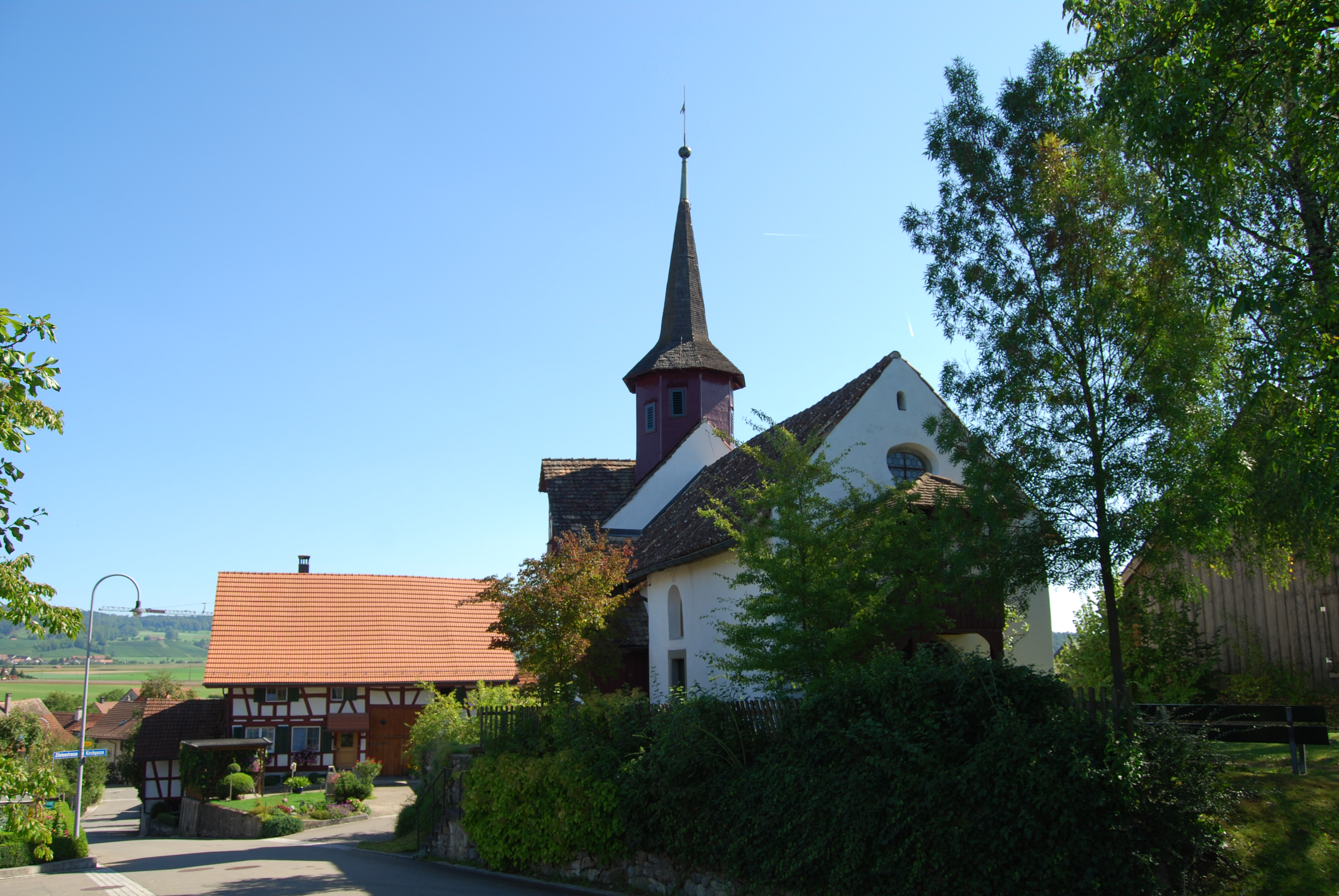

- Flag Coat of arms
- Location of Waltalingen
- Location within Switzerland Location within Canton of Zurich
- Coordinates: 47°37′N 8°47′E
- Country: Switzerland
- Canton: Zurich
- District: Andelfingen

Area
  - Total: 7.25 km^{2} (2.80 sq mi)
- Elevation: 429 m (1,407 ft)

Population (December 2020)
  - Total: 655
  - Density: 90.3/km^{2} (234/sq mi)
- Time zone: UTC+01:00 (CET)
  - Summer (DST): UTC+02:00 (CEST)
- Postal code: 8468
- SFOS number: 44
- ISO 3166 code: CH-ZH
- Surrounded by: Basadingen-Schlattingen (TG), Neunforn (TG), Oberstammheim, Ossingen, Truttikon, Unterstammheim
- Website: www.waltalingen.ch

Waltalingen is a former municipality in the district of Andelfingen in the canton of Zürich in Switzerland. On 1 January 2019 the former municipalities of Oberstammheim, Unterstammheim and Waltalingen merged into the new municipality of Stammheim.

== Geography ==
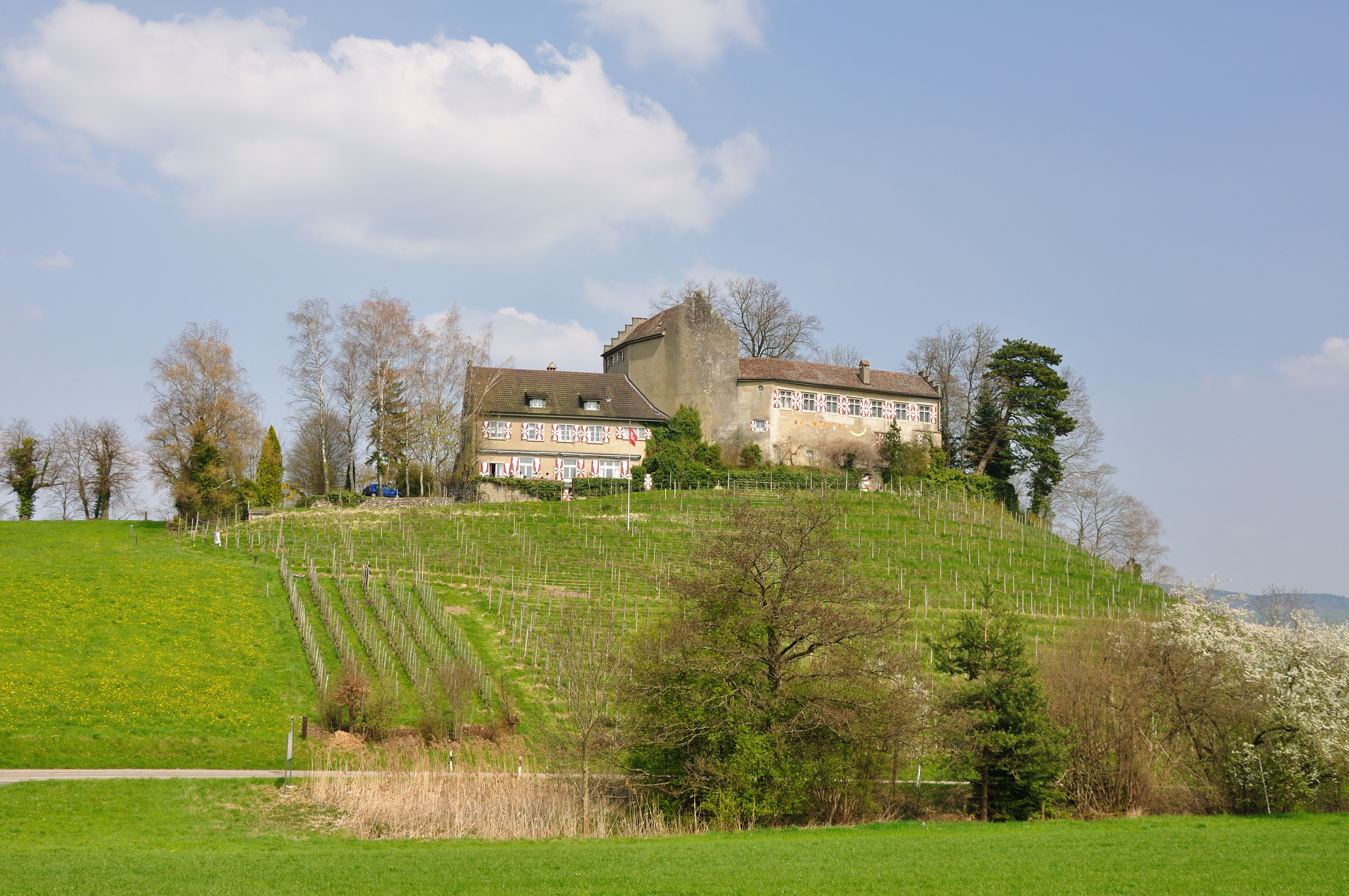
Waltalingen castle

Waltalingen has an area of 7.3 km^{2} (2.8 sq mi). Of this area, 62.6% is used for agricultural purposes, while 28% is forested. Of the rest of the land, 8.8% is settled (buildings or roads) and the remainder (0.5%) is non-productive (rivers, glaciers or mountains).

Aerial view (1948)

== Demographics ==
Waltalingen has a population (as of 31 December 2020) of 655. As of 2007, 5.6% of the population was made up of foreign nationals. Over the last 10 years the population has grown at a rate of 7.2%. Most of the population (as of 2000) speaks German (96.3%), with Albanian being second most common ( 1.6%) and French being third ( 0.6%).

In the 2007 election the most popular party was the SVP which received 51.6% of the vote. The next three most popular parties were the CSP (12.5%), the Green Party (11.6%) and the SPS (10.2%).

The age distribution of the population (as of 2000) is children and teenagers (0–19 years old) make up 33.5% of the population, while adults (20–64 years old) make up 56.3% and seniors (over 64 years old) make up 10.2%. In Waltalingen about 80.1% of the population (between age 25-64) have completed either non-mandatory upper secondary education or additional higher education (either university or a Fachhochschule).

Waltalingen has an unemployment rate of 1.27%. As of 2005, there were 89 people employed in the primary economic sector and about 34 businesses involved in this sector. 32 people are employed in the secondary sector and there are 11 businesses in this sector. 62 people are employed in the tertiary sector, with 16 businesses in this sector.
