= Trüllikon =

- Municipality
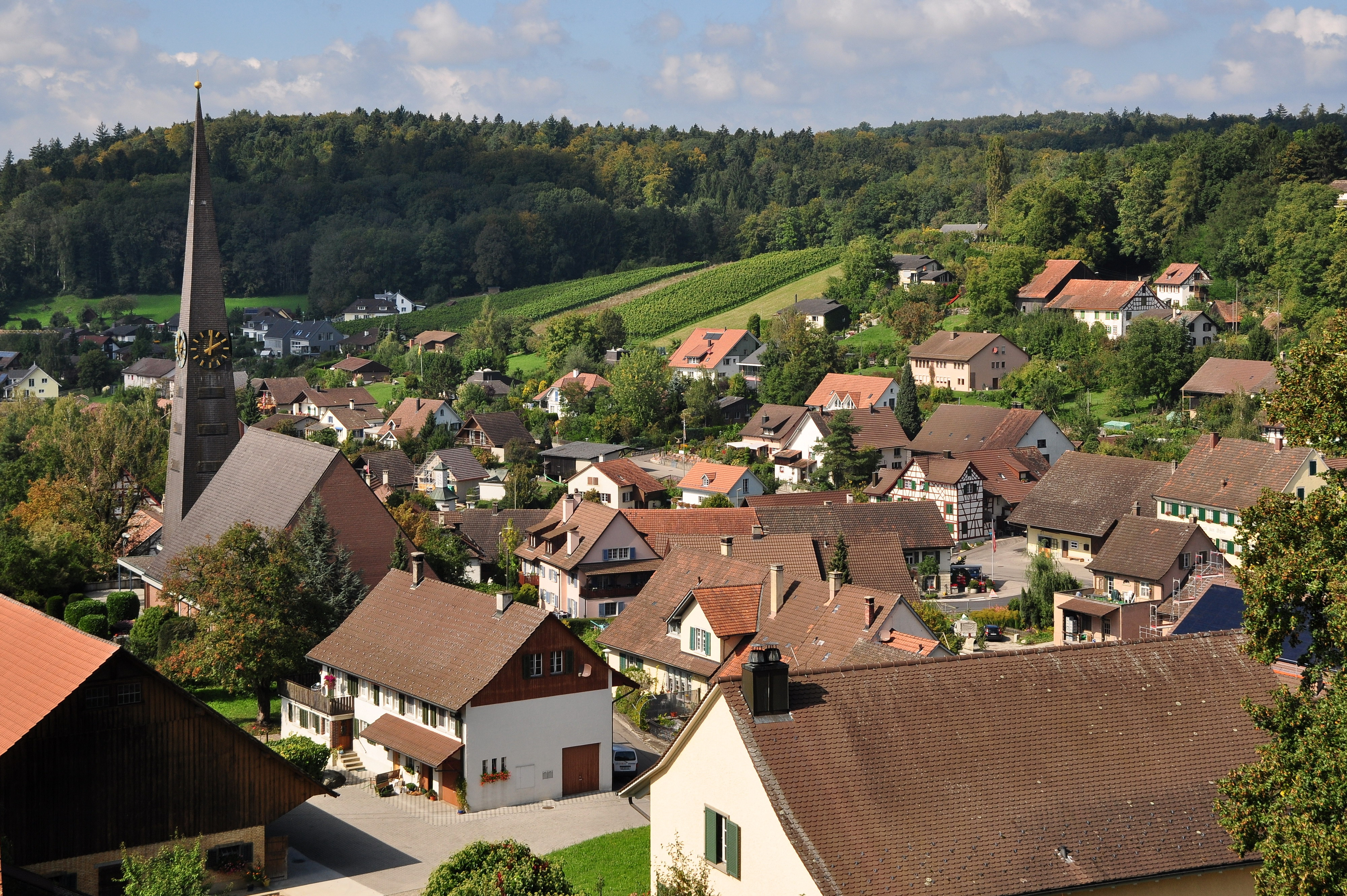

- Flag Coat of arms
- Location of Trüllikon
- Location within Switzerland Location within Canton of Zurich
- Coordinates: 47°38′N 8°42′E
- Country: Switzerland
- Canton: Zurich
- District: Andelfingen

Area
  - Total: 9.80 km^{2} (3.78 sq mi)
- Elevation: 435 m (1,427 ft)

Population (December 2020)
  - Total: 1,055
  - Density: 108/km^{2} (279/sq mi)
- Time zone: UTC+01:00 (CET)
  - Summer (DST): UTC+02:00 (CEST)
- Postal code: 8466
- SFOS number: 40
- ISO 3166 code: CH-ZH
- Surrounded by: Benken, Kleinandelfingen, Laufen-Uhwiesen, Marthalen, Ossingen, Schlatt (TG), Truttikon
- Website: www.truellikon.ch

Trüllikon is a municipality in the district of Andelfingen in the canton of Zürich in Switzerland.

== Geography ==
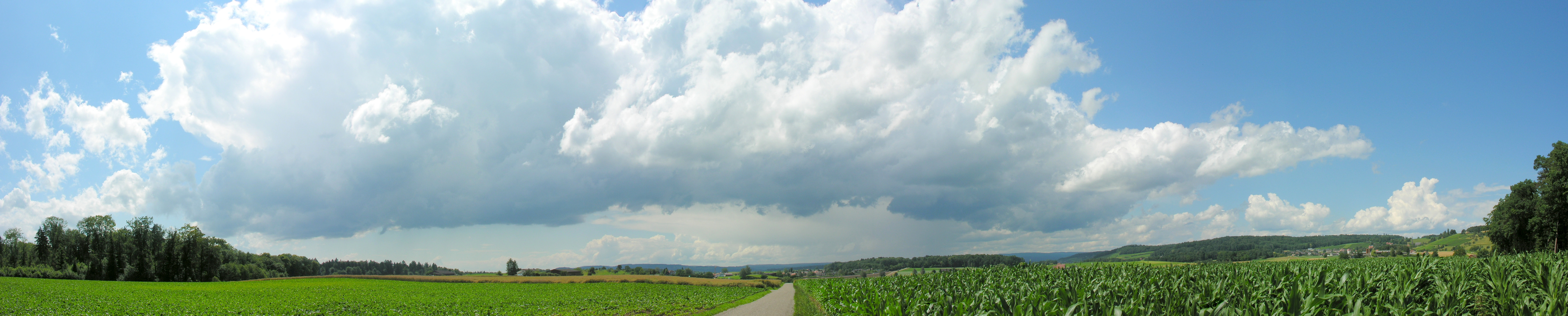
Trüllikon landscape

Aerial view (1953)

Trüllikon has an area of 9.5 km^{2} (3.7 sq mi). Of this area, 63.1% is used for agricultural purposes, 29.4% is forested, 7.3% is settled (buildings or roads), and the remainder (0.2%) is non-productive (rivers, glaciers or mountains).

== Demographics ==
Trüllikon has a population (as of 31 December 2020) of 1,055. As of 2007, 5.4% of the population was made up of foreign nationals. Over the last 10 years the population has decreased at a rate of -0.3%. Most of the population (as of 2000) speaks German (94.6%), with Italian being second most common ( 0.7%) and Serbo-Croatian being third ( 0.6%).

In the 2007 election the most popular party was the SVP which received 52% of the vote. The next three most popular parties were the SPS (14.7%), the Green Party (10.8%) and the FDP (7.3%).

The age distribution of the population (as of 2000) is children and teenagers (0–19 years old) make up 23.5% of the population, while adults (20–64 years old) make up 64% and seniors (over 64 years old) make up 12.5%. In Trüllikon about 79.8% of the population (between age 25-64) have completed either non-mandatory upper secondary education or additional higher education (either university or a Fachhochschule).

Trüllikon has an unemployment rate of 1.53%. As of 2005, there were 141 people employed in the primary economic sector and about 39 businesses involved in this sector; 64 people are employed in the secondary sector and there are 14 businesses in this sector; 90 people are employed in the tertiary sector, with 26 businesses in this sector.
