= Feuerthalen =

- Municipality
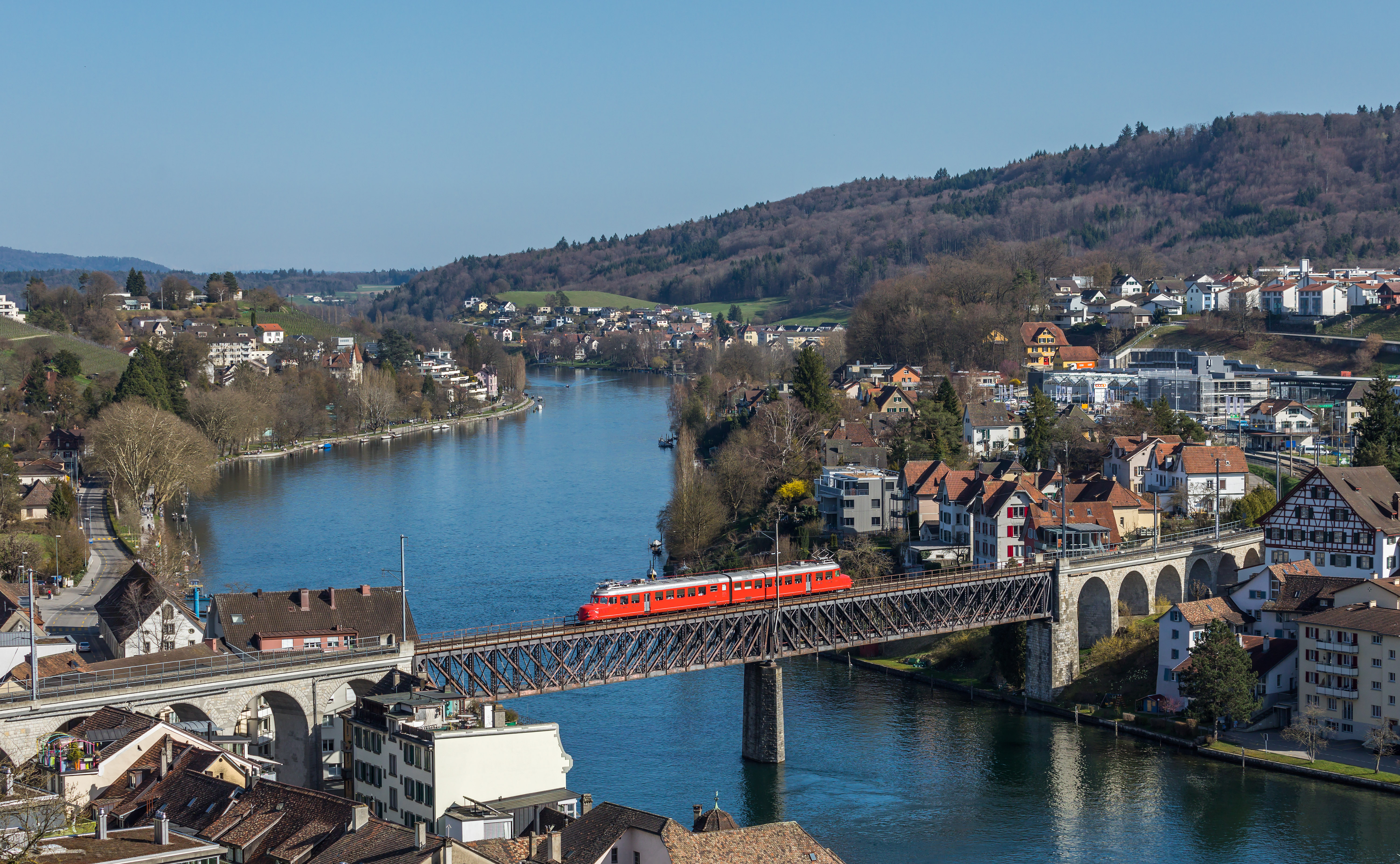
- An SBB Red Arrow double railcar crossing the Feuerthalen Rhine bridge between Feuerthalen (right) and Schaffhausen (left)

- Flag Coat of arms
- Location of Feuerthalen
- Location within Switzerland Location within Canton of Zurich
- Coordinates: 47°41′N 8°39′E
- Country: Switzerland
- Canton: Zurich
- District: Andelfingen

Area
  - Total: 2.49 km^{2} (0.96 sq mi)
- Elevation: 400 m (1,300 ft)

Population (December 2020)
  - Total: 3,697
  - Density: 1,480/km^{2} (3,850/sq mi)
- Time zone: UTC+01:00 (CET)
  - Summer (DST): UTC+02:00 (CEST)
- Postal code: 8245
- SFOS number: 27
- ISO 3166 code: CH-ZH
- Surrounded by: Büsingen am Hochrhein (DE-BW), Flurlingen, Laufen-Uhwiesen, Schlatt (TG), Schaffhausen (SH)
- Website: www.feuerthalen.ch

Feuerthalen is a municipality in the district of Andelfingen in the canton of Zürich in Switzerland. Langwiesen also belongs to the same municipality.

== History ==
Feuerthalen is first mentioned in 876 as Langewisa. In 1318 it was mentioned as Fuirtal an dem Rine.

== Geography ==
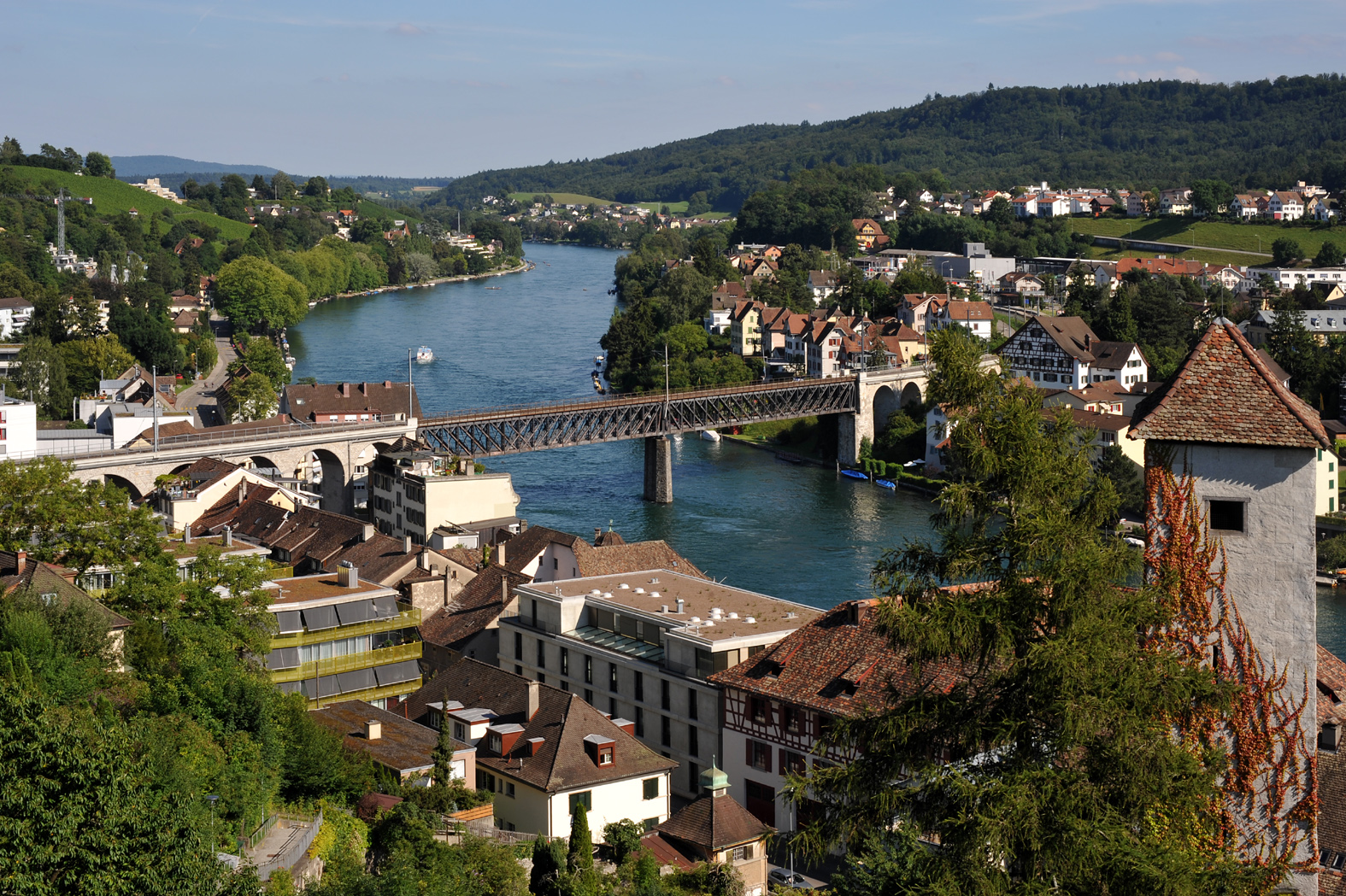
Feuerthalen seen from the Munot castle, 2010

Aerial view from 500 m by Walter Mittelholzer (1929)

Feuerthalen has an area of 2.5 km^{2} (0.97 sq mi). Of this area, 16.1% is used for agricultural purposes, while 43.8% is forested. Of the rest of the land, 38.6% is settled (buildings or roads) and the remainder (1.6%) is non-productive (rivers, glaciers or mountains).

It is located on the left bank of the Rhine and provided the bridgehead on that side of the river for the city of Schaffhausen. It includes the village of Langwiesen which in turn shares an international border with the municipality of Büsingen am Hochrhein which is an exclave of Germany, entirely surrounded by Swiss territory.

== Demographics ==
Feuerthalen has a population (as of 31 December 2020) of 3,697. As of 2007, 19.4% of the population was made up of foreign nationals. Over the last 10 years the population has grown at a rate of 24%. Most of the population (as of 2000) speaks German (91.2%), with Italian being second most common ( 3.0%) and Albanian being third ( 1.3%).

In the 2007 election the most popular party was the SVP which received 37.4% of the vote. The next three most popular parties were the SPS (20.9%), the CVP (10.7%) and the Green Party (10.4%).

The age distribution of the population (as of 2000) is children and teenagers (0–19 years old) make up 20.9% of the population, while adults (20–64 years old) make up 60.2% and seniors (over 64 years old) make up 19%. About 76.2% of the population (between age 25–64) have completed either non-mandatory upper secondary education or additional higher education (either university or a Fachhochschule).

Feuerthalen has an unemployment rate of 2.13%. As of 2005, there were 12 people employed in the primary economic sector and about 1 businesses involved in this sector. 370 people are employed in the secondary sector and there are 33 businesses in this sector. 625 people are employed in the tertiary sector, with 83 businesses in this sector. The historical population is given in the following table:

year	population
1467	56 Adults
1634	205
1739	300
1836	665
1850	769
1900	1,992
1950	2,739
1960	2,961
1990	2,772
2000	2,973

== Notable residents ==
- Swiss-American architect Othmar Ammann was born in Feuerthalen.
- Swiss opera composer Heinrich Sutermeister was born in Feuerthalen.

== See also ==
- Feuerthalen railway station
