= Laufen-Uhwiesen =

- Municipality
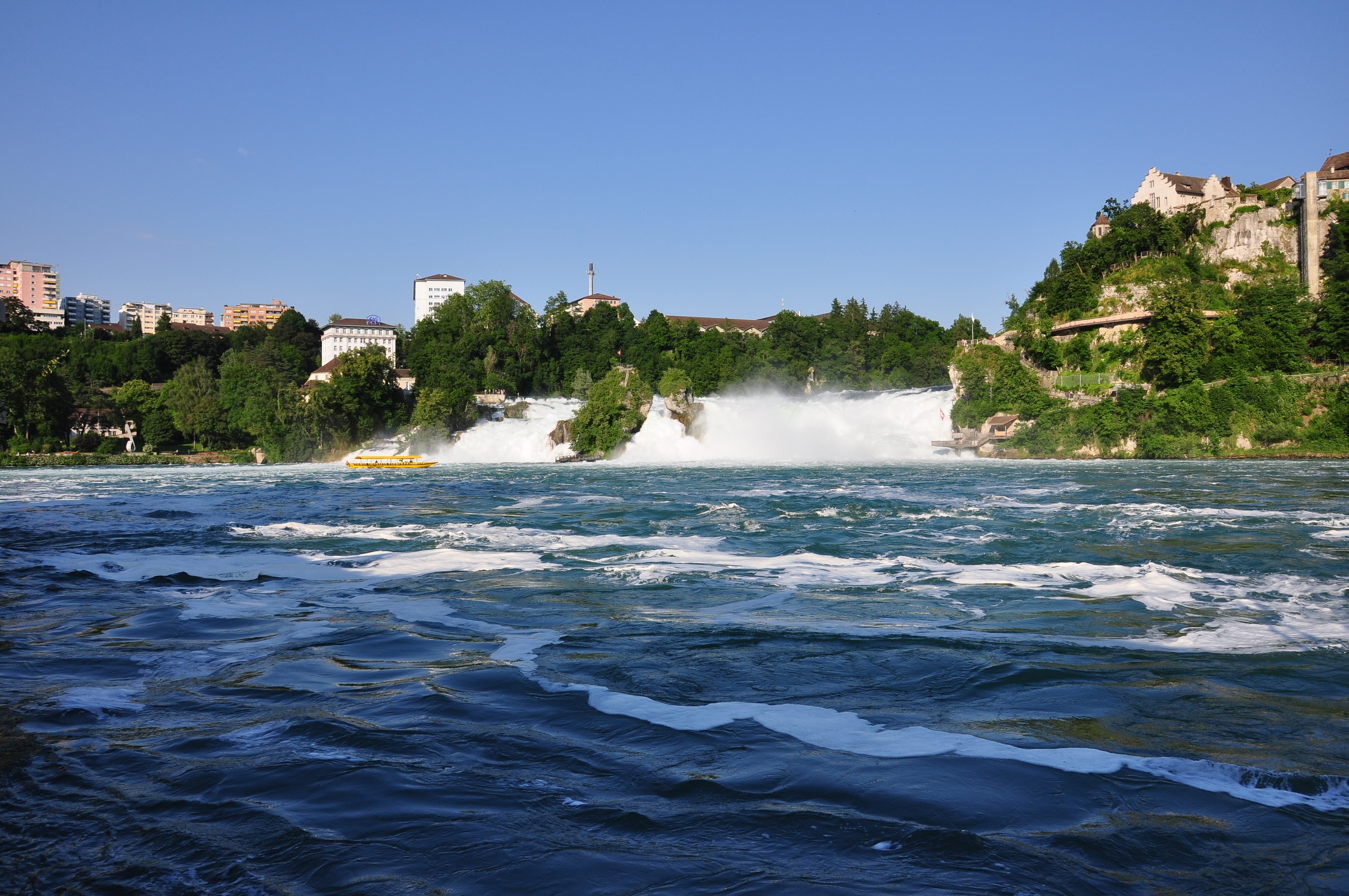

- Flag Coat of arms
- Location of Laufen-Uhwiesen
- Location within Switzerland Location within Canton of Zurich
- Coordinates: 47°40′N 8°38′E
- Country: Switzerland
- Canton: Zurich
- District: Andelfingen

Area
  - Total: 6.27 km^{2} (2.42 sq mi)
- Elevation: 457 m (1,499 ft)

Population (December 2020)
  - Total: 1,779
  - Density: 284/km^{2} (735/sq mi)
- Time zone: UTC+01:00 (CET)
  - Summer (DST): UTC+02:00 (CEST)
- Postal code: 8248
- SFOS number: 34
- ISO 3166 code: CH-ZH
- Surrounded by: Benken, Dachsen, Feuerthalen, Flurlingen, Jestetten (DE-BW), Neuhausen am Rheinfall (SH), Schlatt (TG), Trüllikon
- Website: www.laufen-uhwiesen.ch

Laufen-Uhwiesen is a municipality in the district of Andelfingen in the canton of Zürich in Switzerland.

== History ==
Aerial view (1958)

Laufen-Uhwiesen is first mentioned in 858 as ad Laufin. In 1290 it was mentioned as ze Uwisan.

== Geography ==
Laufen-Uhwiesen has an area of 6.3 km^{2} (2.4 sq mi). Of this area, 40.1% is used for agricultural purposes, while 44.4% is forested. Of the rest of the land, 11.7% is settled (buildings or roads) and the remainder (3.8%) is non-productive (rivers, glaciers or mountains).

The municipality is located on the edge of the Schaffhausen Agglomeration, though it is in the canton of Zürich. It includes the village of Uhwiesen, which is located on a terrace of the Cholfirst elevation, the village of Laufen with Laufen Castle on the Rhine Falls, and the hamlet of Nohl on the right bank of the Rhine. Until 1840, it was part of the municipality of Flurlingen.

== Demographics ==
Laufen-Uhwiesen has a population (as of 31 December 2020) of 1,779. As of 2007, 9.3% of the population was made up of foreign nationals. Over the last 10 years the population has grown at a rate of 13.3%. Most of the population (as of 2000) speaks German (97.0%), with English being second most common (0.8%) and French being third (0.4%).

In the 2007 election the most popular party was the SVP which received 44.4% of the vote. The next three most popular parties were the FDP (15.5%), the SPS (12.2%) and the Green Party (9.2%).

The age distribution of the population (as of 2000) is children and teenagers (0–19 years old) make up 22.2% of the population, while adults (20–64 years old) make up 62.5% and seniors (over 64 years old) make up 15.3%. The entire Swiss population is generally well educated. In Laufen-Uhwiesen about 86.1% of the population (between age 25–64) have completed either non-mandatory upper secondary education or additional higher education (either university or a Fachhochschule).

Laufen-Uhwiesen has an unemployment rate of 1.22%. As of 2005, there were 75 people employed in the primary economic sector and about 23 businesses involved in this sector. 88 people are employed in the secondary sector and there are 13 businesses in this sector. 179 people are employed in the tertiary sector, with 30 businesses in this sector.

The historical population is given in the following table:

year	population
1467	41 Households
1643	388
1850	794
1900	824
1950	795
1970	1,048
2000	1,369

== Transportation ==
Schloss Laufen am Rheinfall railway station is a stop of the S-Bahn Zürich on the line S33.
