= Andelfingen District =

Coordinates: 47°37′N 8°40′E

Andelfingen District Bezirk Andelfingen
- District
- Flag Coat of arms
- Country: Switzerland
- Canton: Zürich
- Capital: Andelfingen

Area
  - Total: 166.64 km^{2} (64.34 sq mi)

Population (31 December 2020)
  - Total: 31,959
  - Density: 191.78/km^{2} (496.72/sq mi)
- Time zone: UTC+1 (CET)
  - Summer (DST): UTC+2 (CEST)
- Municipalities: 20

Andelfingen District is one of the twelve districts of the German-speaking canton of Zurich, Switzerland.

It corresponds to the Zürcher Weinland, bounded by the Rhine to the north and west, by the canton of Thurgau to the east, by Winterthur to the south and by the Irchel to the southwest.

== Municipalities ==
Andelfingen contains a total of twenty municipalities:

Coat of arms	Name	Postal code	Population 31 December 2017	Area in km^{2}	Population per km^{2}
Andelfingen	Andelfingen	8450	2208	6.73	328
Benken ZH	Benken (ZH)	8463	858	5.66	152
Berg am Irchel	Berg am Irchel	8415	564	7.01	80
Buch am Irchel	Buch am Irchel	8414	971	10.21	95
Dachsen	Dachsen	8447	1936	2.70	717
Dorf	Dorf	8458	687	5.56	124
Feuerthalen	Feuerthalen	8245	3641	2.48	1468
Flaach	Flaach	8416	1390	10.17	137
Flurlingen	Flurlingen	8247	1440	2.41	598
Henggart	Henggart	8444	2268	3.03	749
Kleinandelfingen	Kleinandelfingen	8451	2076	10.29	202
Laufen-Uhwiesen	Laufen-Uhwiesen	8248	1668	6.28	266
Marthalen	Marthalen	8460	1957	14.13	138
Ossingen	Ossingen	8475	1567	13.09	120
Rheinau	Rheinau	8462	1299	8.94	145
Stammheim	Stammheim	8468, 8476, 8477	2746	23.93	115
Thalheim an der Thur	Thalheim an der Thur	8478	929	6.44	144
Trüllikon	Trüllikon	8466	1059	9.56	111
Truttikon	Truttikon	8467	478	4.41	108
Volken	Volken	8459	342	3.20	107
Total (22)			31 235	166.51	188

== Mergers ==
- 1872: Secession from Adlikon → Humlikon
- 1878: Renaming of Dorlikon → Thalheim an der Thur
- 1879: Secession from Trüllikon → Truttikon
- 1970: Renaming of Grossandelfingen → Andelfingen
- 2013: Merger between „Obere Hueb“ from the Municipality of Buch am Irchel → Neftenbach
- 2019: Merger between Oberstammheim, Unterstammheim and Waltalingen → Stammheim
- 2023: Merger between Adlikon and Humlikon → Andelfingen

== See also ==
- Municipalities of the canton of Zürich
