= Kleinandelfingen =

- Municipality
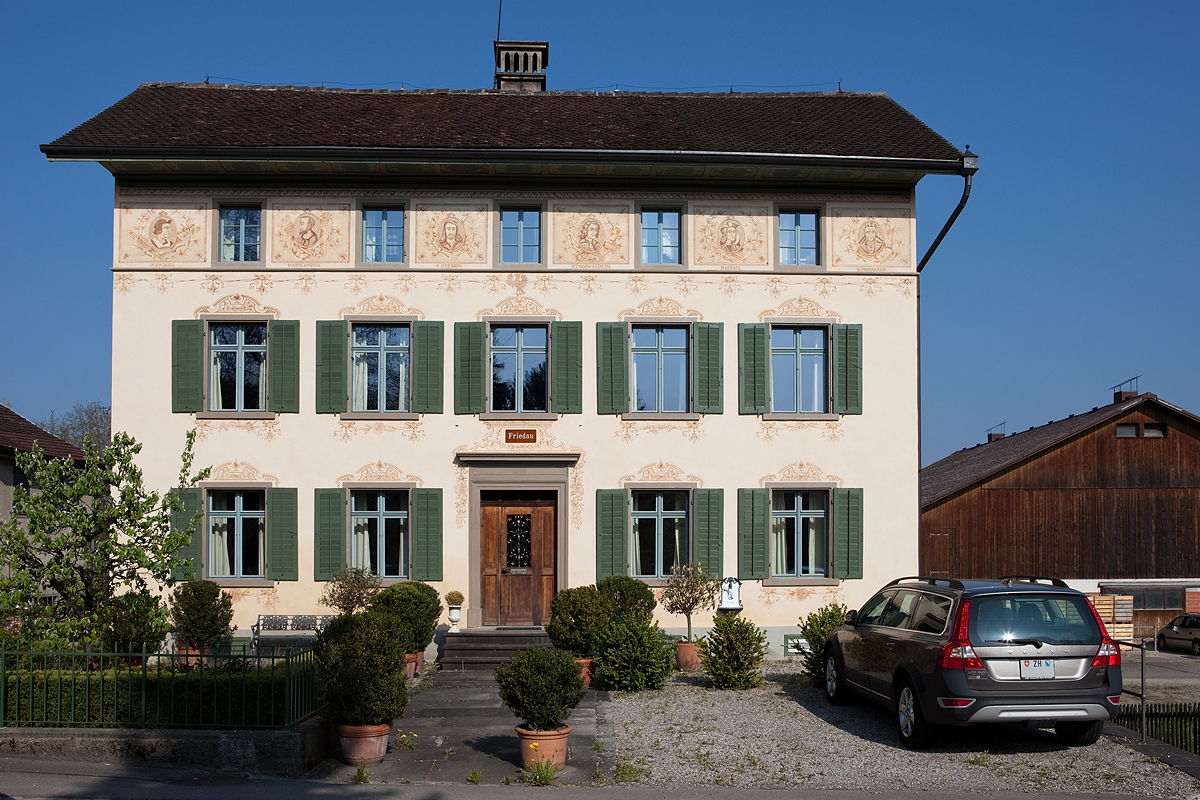

- Flag Coat of arms
- Location of Kleinandelfingen
- Location within Switzerland Location within Canton of Zurich
- Coordinates: 47°36′N 8°41′E
- Country: Switzerland
- Canton: Zurich
- District: Andelfingen

Area
  - Total: 10.36 km^{2} (4.00 sq mi)
- Elevation: 370 m (1,210 ft)

Population (December 2020)
  - Total: 2,104
  - Density: 203.1/km^{2} (526.0/sq mi)
- Time zone: UTC+01:00 (CET)
  - Summer (DST): UTC+02:00 (CEST)
- Postal code: 8451
- SFOS number: 33
- ISO 3166 code: CH-ZH
- Surrounded by: Andelfingen, Flaach, Marthalen, Ossingen, Trüllikon
- Website: www.kleinandelfingen.ch

Kleinandelfingen is a municipality in the district of Andelfingen in the canton of Zürich in Switzerland.

== History ==
Aerial view (1964)

Kleinandelfingen is first mentioned around 1270 as ex opposito Andolfingen ultra Thuram. Between 1303-09 it was mentioned as Andolfingen ennunt der Ture, in 1427 as Minder Andellfingen, and in 1474 as von cleinen Andelffingen. The village of Oerlingen was mentioned in 1241 as in villa Oerlingin. Alten was first mentioned in 1361 as Alta.

== Geography ==
Kleinandelfingen has an area of 10.3 km^{2} (4.0 sq mi). Of this area, 51.2% is used for agricultural purposes, while 33.5% is forested. Of the rest of the land, 11.9% is settled (buildings or roads) and the remainder (3.4%) is non-productive (rivers, glaciers or mountains).

The municipality is located on the right bank of the Thur river and includes a bridge over the river. The municipality also includes the villages of Oerlingen and Alten.

== Demographics ==
Kleinandelfingen has a population (as of 31 December 2020) of 2,104. As of 2007, 9.5% of the population was made up of foreign nationals. Over the last 10 years the population has grown at a rate of 17.1%. Most of the population (as of 2000) speaks German (91.9%), with Italian being second most common ( 2.0%) and Serbo-Croatian being third ( 1.6%).

In the 2007 election the most popular party was the SVP which received 44.9% of the vote. The next three most popular parties were the SPS (14.4%), the CSP (11.6%) and the FDP (11.4%).

The age distribution of the population (as of 2000) is children and teenagers (0–19 years old) make up 26.4% of the population, while adults (20–64 years old) make up 61.3% and seniors (over 64 years old) make up 12.2%. In Kleinandelfingen about 80.3% of the population (between age 25-64) have completed either non-mandatory upper secondary education or additional higher education (either university or a Fachhochschule).

Kleinandelfingen has an unemployment rate of 1.17%. As of 2005, there were 117 people employed in the primary economic sector and about 38 businesses involved in this sector. 262 people are employed in the secondary sector and there are 26 businesses in this sector. 422 people are employed in the tertiary sector, with 75 businesses in this sector. The historical population is given in the following table:

year	population
1468	17 Households
1634	362
1850	1,114
1900	1,036
1950	949
1970	1,202
2000	1,821
