= Felix Meyer =

Swiss painter and engraver (1653–1713)

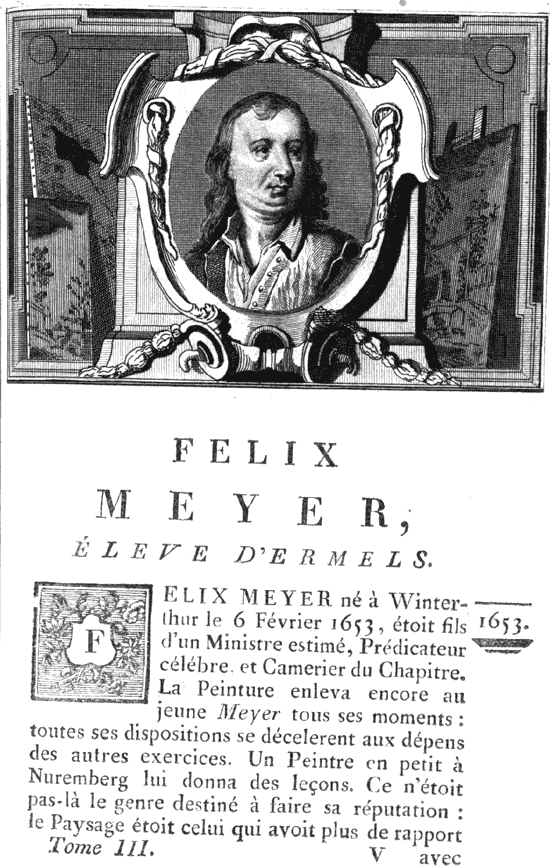
Felix Meyer biography with portrait in Jean-Baptiste Descamps' Tome Troisieme, 1760

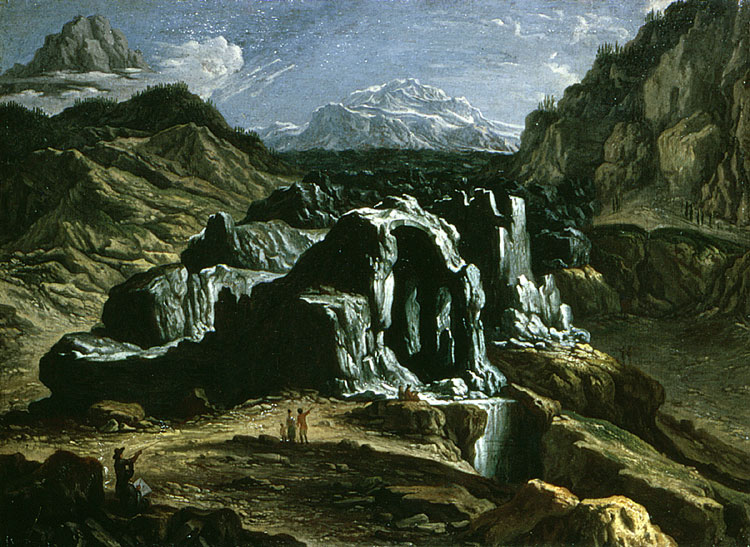
Grindelwald glaciers by Felix Meyer, Kunstmuseum Winterthur, 1700

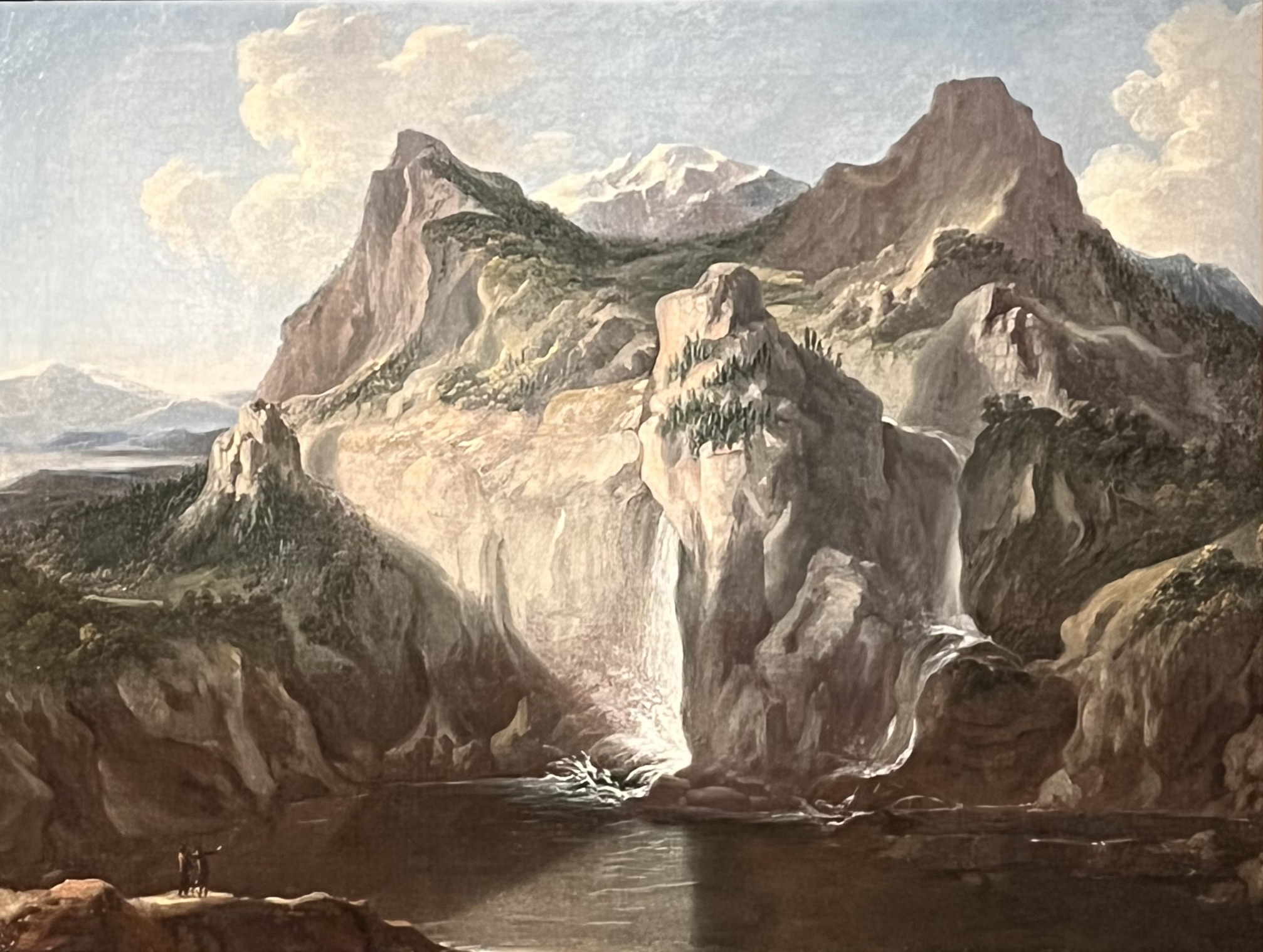
Mountain landscape with lake

Felix Meyer (1 February 1653 – 11 June 1713) was a Swiss painter and engraver.

== Biography ==
Meyer was born in Winterthur. He primarily painted landscapes. Meyer moved to Nuremberg in 1678 where he studied painting and the arts. During his time there he met Georg Philipp Rugendas. Meyer moved back to Winterthur in 1678 to live and work. He painted a number of landscape works based on the mountains and glaciers there.

Starting in 1688, Meyer was involved in local politics and the community, first as First Sergeant in Winterthur, then in 1697 as part of the Grand Council of Winterthur. From 1699 to 1703 he lived for a time in Bern. He later returned to Winterthur where he acted as a steward at the Wyden Castle.
