= Isabelle Waldberg =

Isabelle Waldberg, née Isabelle Margaretha Maria Farner (10 May 1911 – 12 April 1990) was a French-Swiss sculptor associated with surrealism.

== Life ==
Isabelle Farner was born on (10 May 1911 in Oberstammheim, Switzerland. She studied under Hannes Meyer in Zürich before moving to Paris in 1936, where she studied under Marcel Gimond at the Académie Colarossi, Robert Vlerick at the Académie de la Grande Chaumiere and Charles Malfray at the Académie Ranson. Studying in Florence in 1937, she returned to Paris, where she came to know Alberto Giacometti, Georges Bataille, André Masson and her future husband Patrick Waldberg. From 1938 to 1940 she studied sociology and ethnography at the Ecole des Hautes Etudes. She also attended discussion of the sacred at the College of Sociology, and contributed to Bataille's journal Acéphale.

In 1941 she travelled to New York City, where she lived for the next five years. There she was influenced by surrealist exiles, including Andre Breton, Max Ernst and Marcel Duchamp. During this period she started working on "constructions" made of bound beech dowels, these were exhibited at the gallery Art Of This Century owned by Peggy Guggenheim, in 1943. She contributed to the magazine VVV in 1944, and held her first exhibition at The Art of This Century gallery. Returning to Paris in 1946, she worked in Duchamp's old studio at 11 Rue Larrey. From 1947 to 1948 she co-edited Da Costa Encyclopédique, a surrealist review, with the writer Robert Lebel.

== Works ==
- Laocoon, 1950
- La Ruine, 1965
- Portrait intérieur, 1907
- Delescluze descend vers le Chateau d'Eau, 1973
- Le Cypres dans la Cour, 1974
- Portrait de Marcel Duchamp sur un échiquier ..., 1978-79
