= Ossingen =

- Municipality
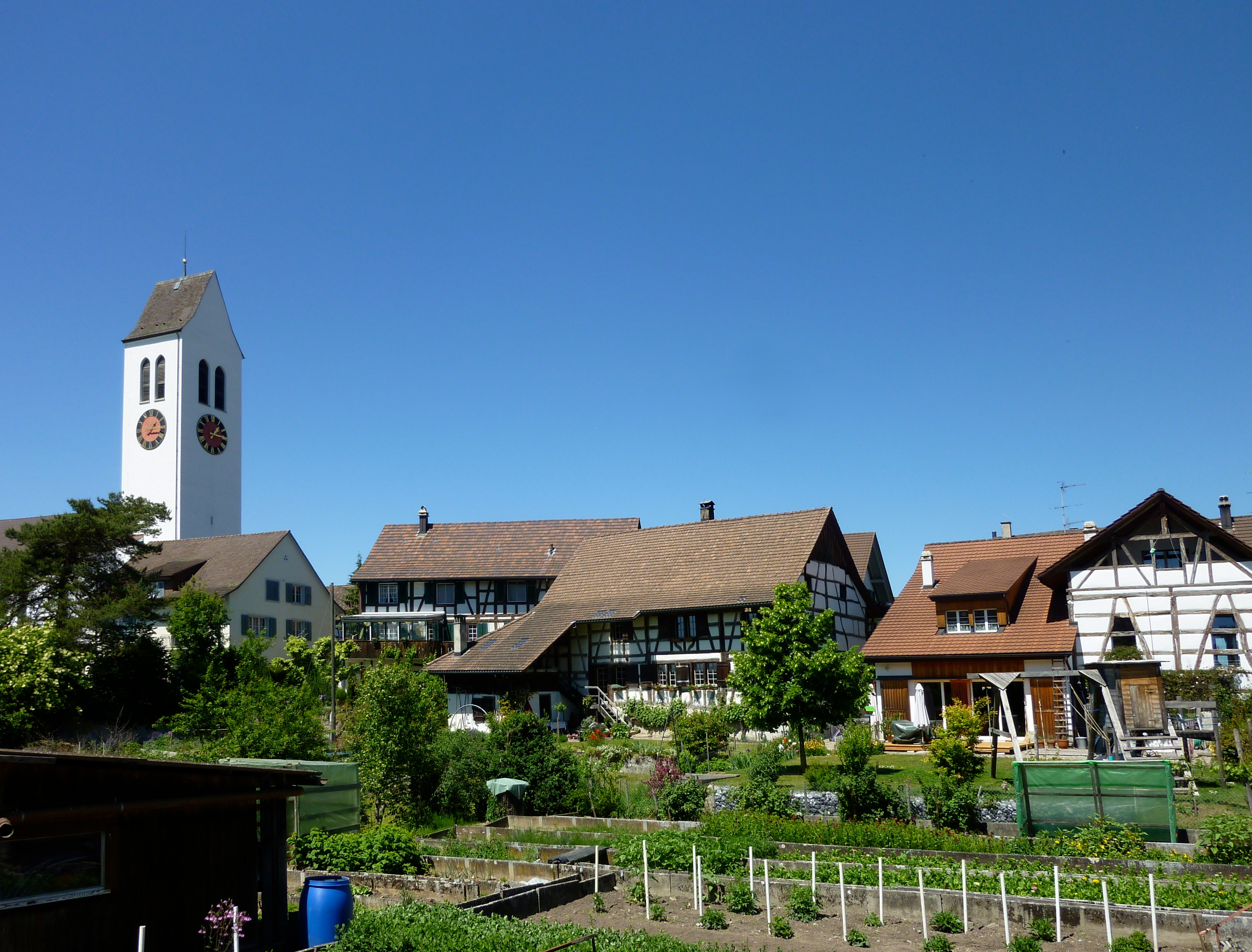

- Flag Coat of arms
- Location of Ossingen
- Location within Switzerland Location within Canton of Zurich
- Coordinates: 47°37′N 8°44′E
- Country: Switzerland
- Canton: Zurich
- District: Andelfingen

Area
  - Total: 13.07 km^{2} (5.05 sq mi)
- Elevation: 416 m (1,365 ft)

Population (December 2020)
  - Total: 1,724
  - Density: 131.9/km^{2} (341.6/sq mi)
- Time zone: UTC+01:00 (CET)
  - Summer (DST): UTC+02:00 (CEST)
- Postal code: 8475
- SFOS number: 37
- ISO 3166 code: CH-ZH
- Surrounded by: Adlikon, Andelfingen, Kleinandelfingen, Neunforn (TG), Thalheim an der Thur, Trüllikon, Truttikon, Waltalingen
- Website: www.ossingen.ch

Ossingen is a municipality in the district of Andelfingen in the canton of Zürich in Switzerland.

== History ==
Ossingen is first mentioned in 1230 as de Ozzingin.

== Geography ==
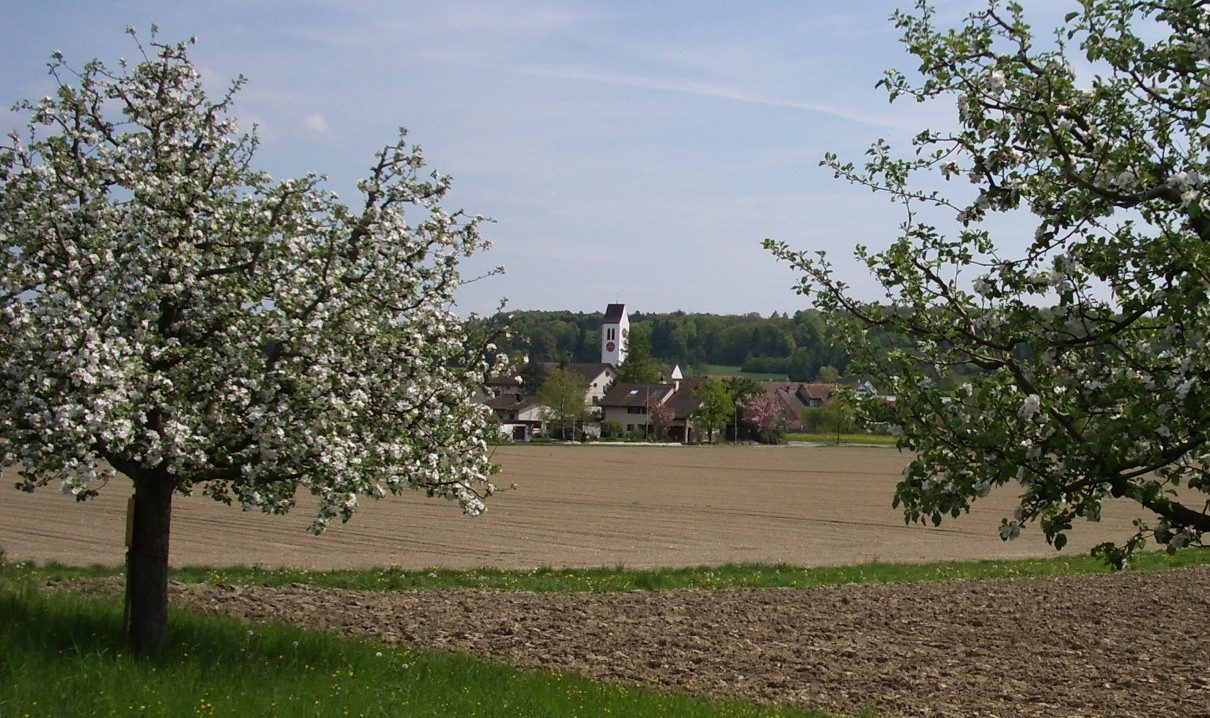
Ossingen, seen from the West

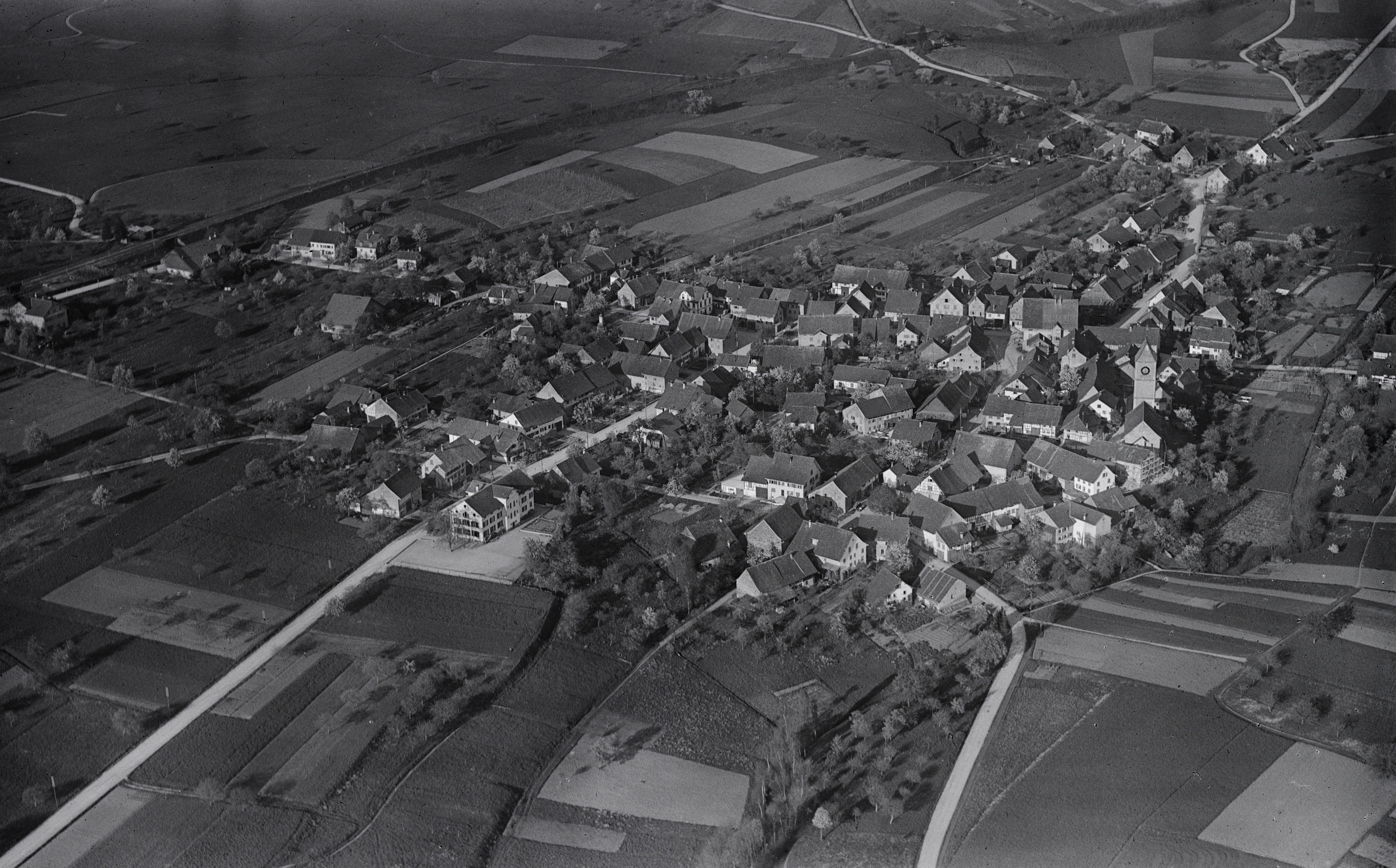
Aerial view by Walter Mittelholzer (1923)

Ossingen has an area of 13.1 km^{2} (5.1 sq mi). Of this area, 57.9% is used for agricultural purposes, 30% is forested, 7.9% is settled (buildings or roads) and the remainder (4.2%) is non-productive (rivers, glaciers or mountains).

The municipality includes the village of Ossingen, the hamlets of Weiler Burghof, Gisenhard, Hausen and Langenmoos, the farming settlements of Werdhof, Ziegelhütte and Dachsenhausen as well as Schloss Wyden (Widen Castle). It also includes the Husemersee a lake located in the municipality.

== Demographics ==
Ossingen has a population (as of 31 December 2020) of 1,724. As of 2007, 7.0% of the population was made up of foreign nationals. Over the last 10 years the population has grown at a rate of 9.9%. Most of the population (as of 2000) speaks German (94.7%), with Albanian being second most common ( 1.5%) and Italian being third ( 0.5%).

In the 2007 election the most popular party was the SVP which received 48.8% of the vote. The next three most popular parties were the SPS (13.8%), the Green Party (10.7%) and the FDP (10.6%).

The age distribution of the population (as of 2000) is children and teenagers (0–19 years old) make up 28.6% of the population, while adults (20–64 years old) make up 57.4% and seniors (over 64 years old) make up 14%. In Ossingen about 79% of the population (between age 25-64) have completed either non-mandatory upper secondary education or additional higher education (either university or a Fachhochschule).

Ossingen has an unemployment rate of 1.22%. As of 2005, there were 105 people employed in the primary economic sector and about 35 businesses are involved in this sector; 79 people are employed in the secondary sector and there are 18 businesses in this sector; 193 people are employed in the tertiary sector, with 38 businesses in this sector. The historical population is given in the following table:

year	population
15th Century	330
1682	974
1850	1,198
1900	930
1950	805
2000	1,272

== Transport ==
Ossingen railway station is served by Zurich S-Bahn line S29, which links Winterthur and Stein am Rhein.

== See also ==
- Schloss Wyden
