= Wyden Castle =

Castle in Ossingen, canton of Zürich, Switzerland

Coordinates: 47°36′28.4″N 8°42′55.7″E

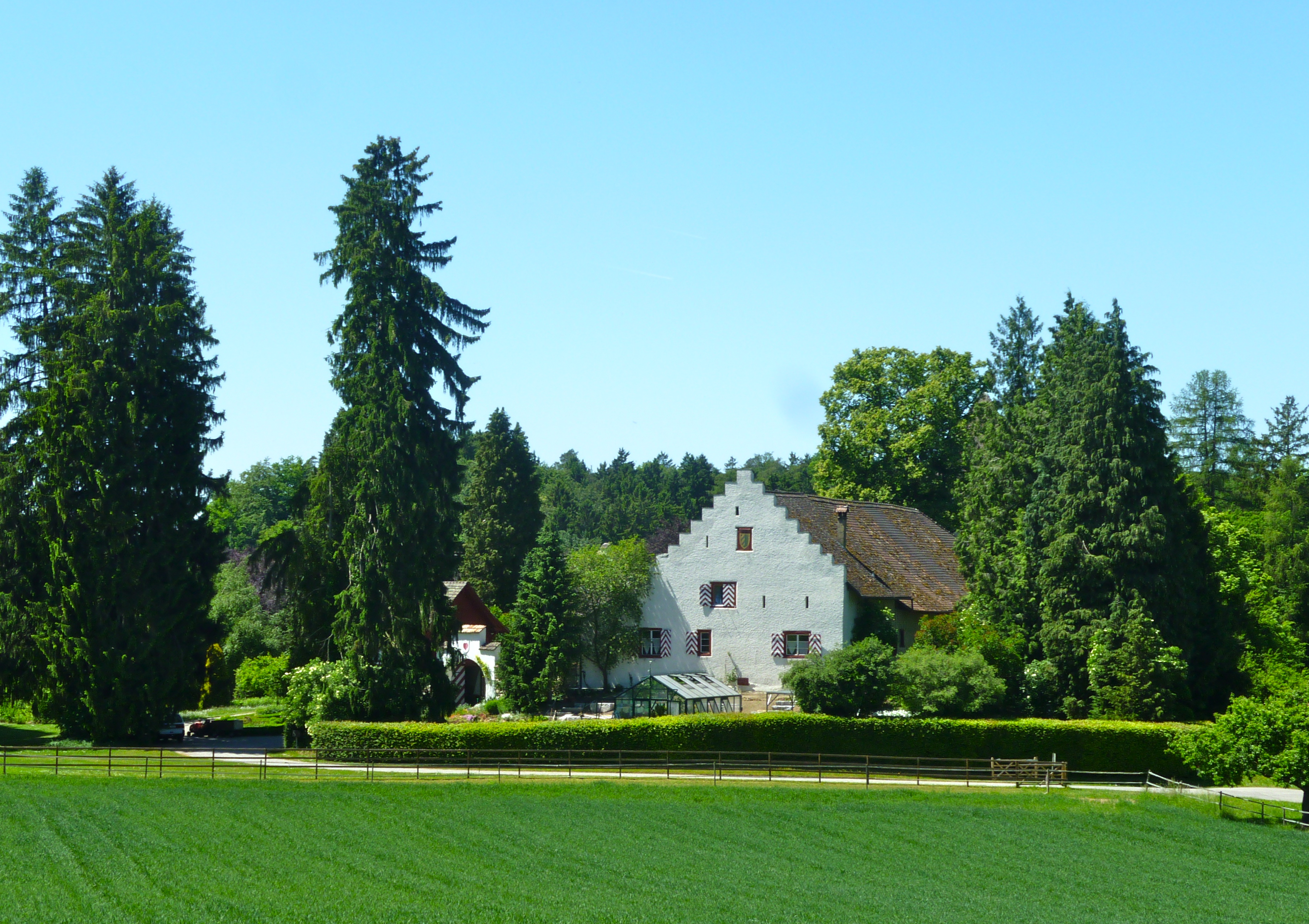
East view

Wyden Castle (German: Schloss Wyden) is a castle in the municipality of Ossingen of the Canton of Zurich in Switzerland. It is a Swiss heritage site of regional significance.

== History ==
The castle complex served as a control for the Thur river valley. It has been rebuilt several times. The oldest part, the fortified tower, dates from the 13th century. In his later years, the painter Felix Meyer (1653-1713) lived here. In 1903, the castle became the home of Max Huber. Today, his descendants occupy the castle. It is a private residence.

== Films ==
The Internet Movie Database lists Schloss Wyden as a filming location for Erwin C. Dietrich's 1982 film, Julchen und Jettchen, die verliebten Apothekerstöchter.

== Bibliography ==
- Kunstführer durch die Schweiz, Band 1 Herausgegeben von der Gesellschaft für Schweizerische Kunstgeschichte, Auflage 6, Büchler-Verlag, Wabern 1975, ISBN 3-7170-0115-9, S. 888
