= Benken, Zürich =

Benken
- Municipality
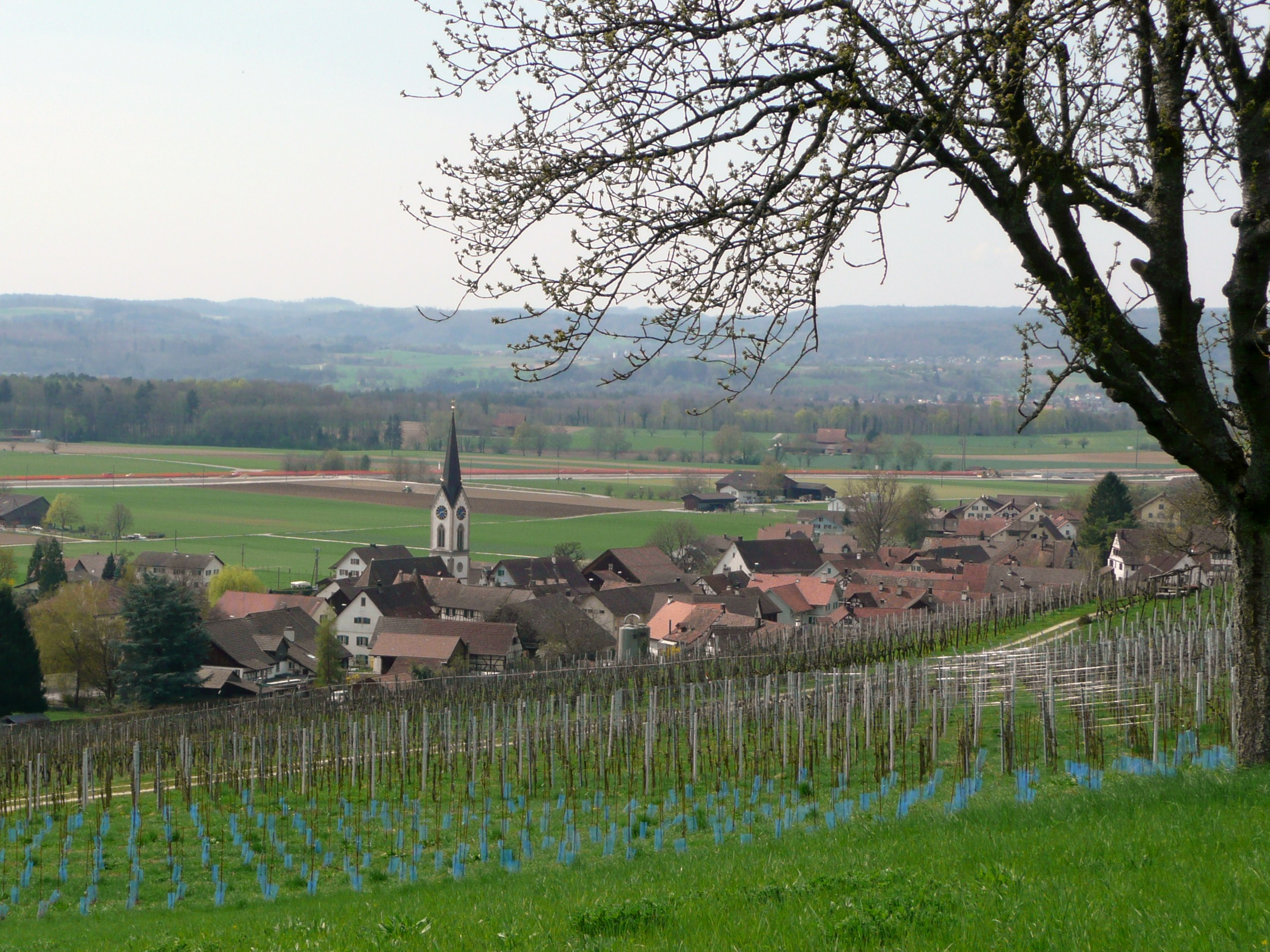

- Flag Coat of arms
- Location of Benken
- Location within Switzerland Location within Canton of Zurich
- Coordinates: 47°39′N 8°39′E
- Country: Switzerland
- Canton: Zurich
- District: Andelfingen

Area
  - Total: 5.67 km^{2} (2.19 sq mi)
- Elevation: 420 m (1,380 ft)

Population (December 2020)
  - Total: 856
  - Density: 151/km^{2} (391/sq mi)
- Time zone: UTC+01:00 (CET)
  - Summer (DST): UTC+02:00 (CEST)
- Postal code: 8463
- SFOS number: 22
- ISO 3166 code: CH-ZH
- Surrounded by: Dachsen, Laufen-Uhwiesen, Marthalen, Rheinau, Trüllikon
- Website: www.benken-zh.ch

Benken is a municipality in the district of Andelfingen in the canton of Zürich in Switzerland.

== History ==
Benken is first mentioned in 858 as Pecchinhova.

== Geography ==
Benken has an area of 5.7 km^{2} (2.2 sq mi). Of this area, 59% is used for agricultural purposes, while 33.6% is forested. The rest of the land, (7.4%) is settled.

The municipality is surrounded by vineyards and is located at the south-west foot of Cholfirst mountain.

Aerial view by Walter Mittelholzer (1919)

== Demographics ==
Benken has a population (as of 31 December 2020) of 856. As of 2007, 7.7% of the population was made up of foreign nationals. Over the last 10 years the population has decreased at a rate of -0.5%. Most of the population (as of 2000) speaks German (93.8%), with French being second most common ( 1.4%) and Spanish being third ( 0.7%).

In the 2007 election the most popular party was the SVP which received 55.5% of the vote. The next three most popular parties were the SPS (14.3%), the Green Party (9%) and the FDP (5.8%).

The age distribution of the population (as of 2000) is children and teenagers (0–19 years old) make up 29.3% of the population, while adults (20–64 years old) make up 58% and seniors (over 64 years old) make up 12.8%. In Benken about 83.2% of the population (between age 25–64) have completed either non-mandatory upper secondary education or additional higher education (either university or a Fachhochschule).

Benken has an unemployment rate of 1.91%. As of 2005, there were 83 people employed in the primary economic sector and about 24 businesses involved in this sector. 34 people are employed in the secondary sector and there are 10 businesses in this sector. 85 people are employed in the tertiary sector, with 24 businesses in this sector. The historical population is given in the following table:

year	population
1467	18 Households
1634	256
1778	475
1850	590
1900	547
1950	492
2000	704
