= Husemersee =

Lake in Zurich, Switzerland

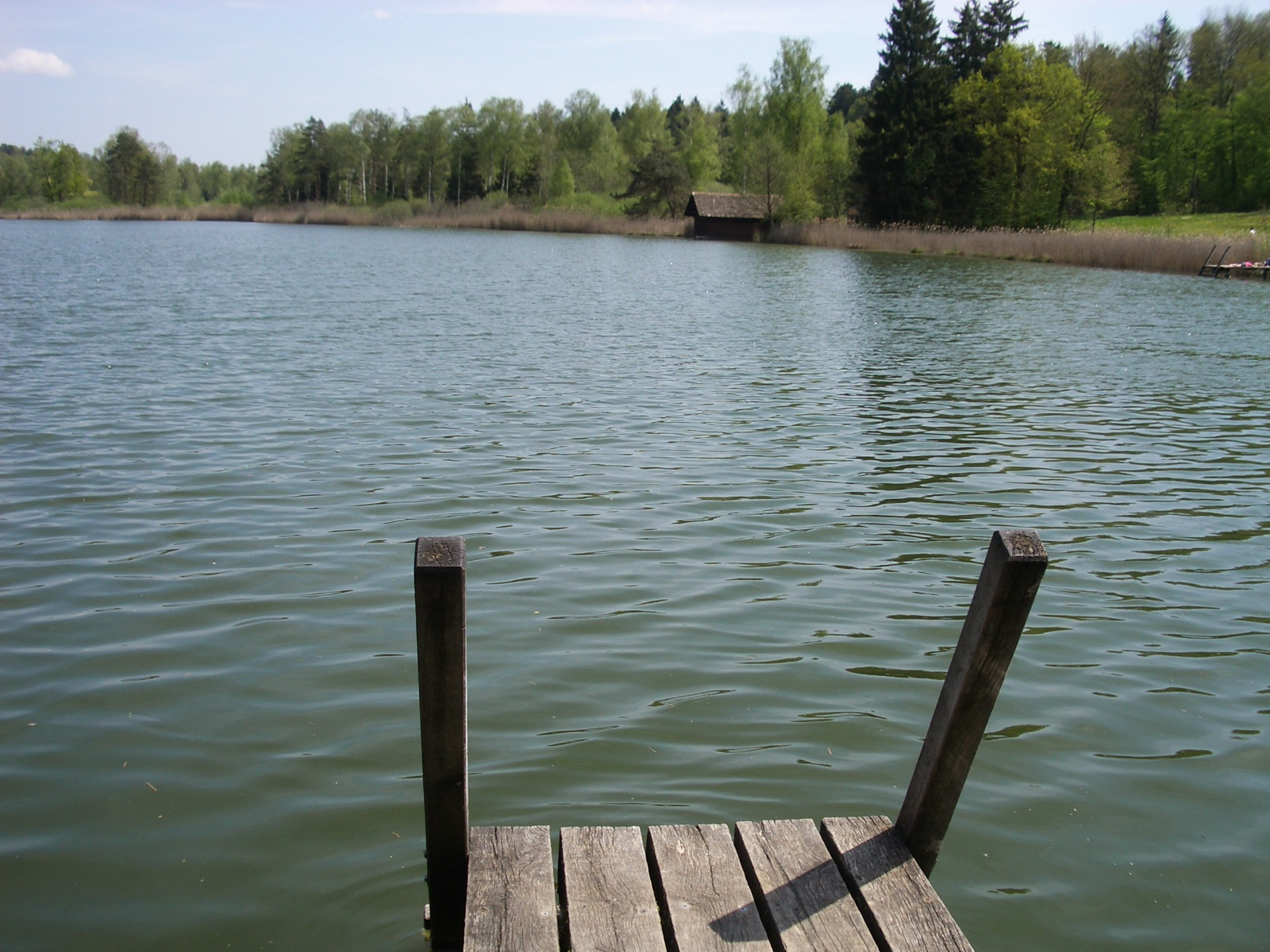

- Location within Canton of Zurich Location within Switzerland Location within Alps
- Interactive map of Husemersee
- Location: Ossingen, Canton of Zurich
- Coordinates: 47°37′19″N 8°42′16″E
- Type: mesotrophic
- Catchment area: 1.436 km^{2} (0.554 sq mi)
- Basin countries: Switzerland
- Surface area: 8 ha (20 acres)
- Average depth: 6.2 m (20 ft)
- Max. depth: 14.3 m (47 ft)
- Water volume: 50,000 cubic metres (41 acre⋅ft)
- Surface elevation: 409 m (1,342 ft)
- Islands: 4

Husemersee (or Hausersee) is a lake at Ossingen in the Canton of Zurich, Switzerland. Its surface area is 8 ha (20 acres). The lake has four small islands.

At Husemersee, swimming is allowed on the western part of the lake. From Ossingen train station, the Husemersee can be reached in a 30mins walk.
