= Dachsen =

- Municipality
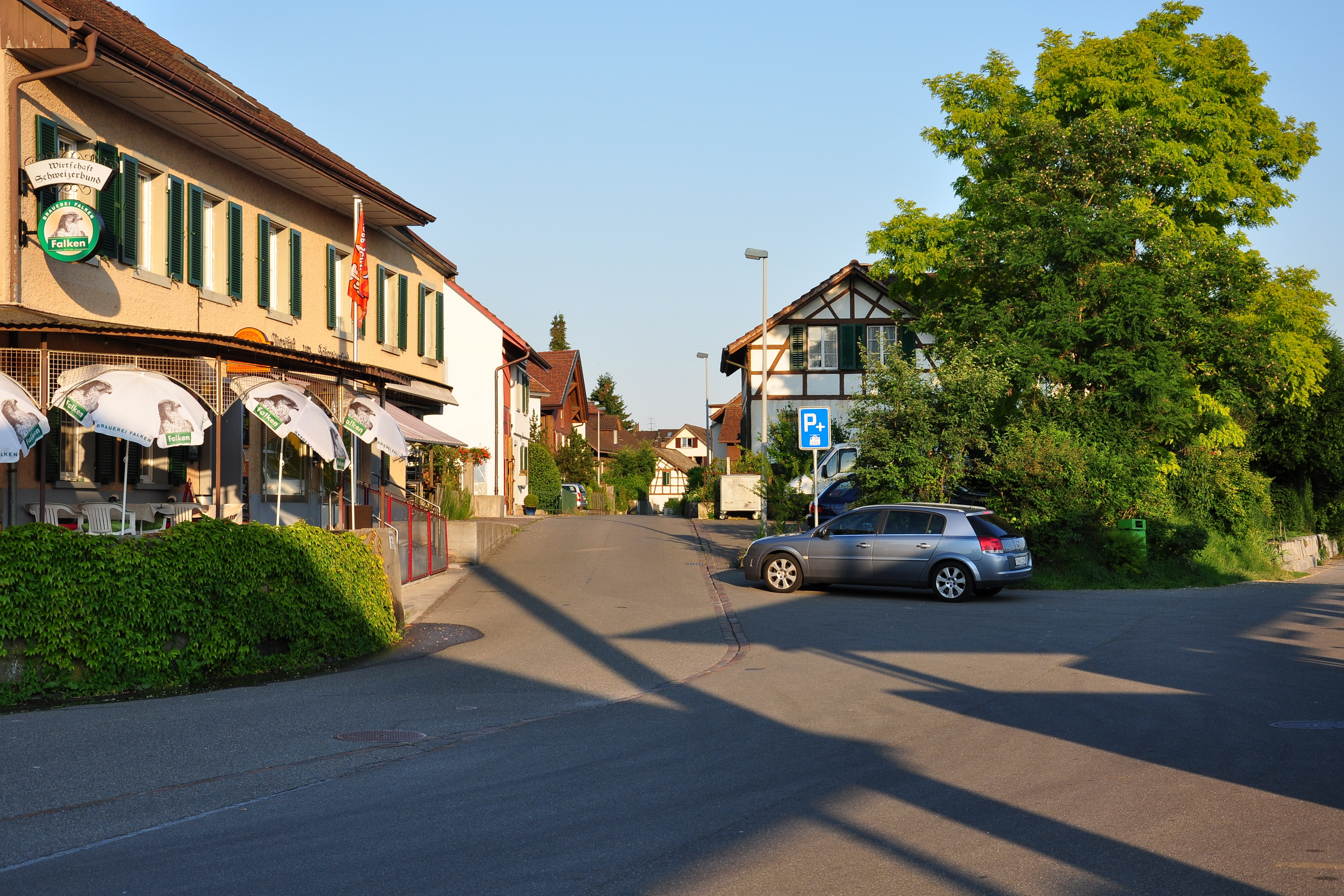

- Flag Coat of arms
- Location of Dachsen
- Location within Switzerland Location within Canton of Zurich
- Coordinates: 47°40′N 8°37′E
- Country: Switzerland
- Canton: Zurich
- District: Andelfingen

Area
  - Total: 2.69 km^{2} (1.04 sq mi)
- Elevation: 400 m (1,300 ft)

Population (December 2020)
  - Total: 1,917
  - Density: 713/km^{2} (1,850/sq mi)
- Time zone: UTC+01:00 (CET)
  - Summer (DST): UTC+02:00 (CEST)
- Postal code: 8447
- SFOS number: 25
- ISO 3166 code: CH-ZH
- Surrounded by: Benken, Jestetten (DE-BW), Laufen-Uhwiesen, Rheinau
- Website: www.dachsen.ch

Dachsen is a municipality in the district of Andelfingen in the canton of Zürich in Switzerland.

== History ==
Dachsen is first mentioned in 876 as Tahsheim.

== Geography ==
Aerial view by Walter Mittelholzer (1919)

Dachsen has an area of 2.7 km^{2} (1.0 sq mi). Of this area, 52.8% is used for agricultural purposes, while 13% is forested. Of the rest of the land, 25.3% is settled (buildings or roads) and the remainder (8.9%) is non-productive (rivers, glaciers or mountains).

The municipality is a linear village (built along a single street) on a terrace near the Rhine knee near Laufen-Uhwiesen. Currently it is part of the agglomeration of Schaffhausen, even though it is in the canton of Zürich.

== Demographics ==
Dachsen has a population (as of 31 December 2020) of 1,917. As of 2007, 11.4% of the population was made up of foreign nationals. Over the last 10 years the population has grown at a rate of 34%. Most of the population (as of 2000) speaks German (95.1%), with Italian being second most common (1.6%) and French being third (0.7%).

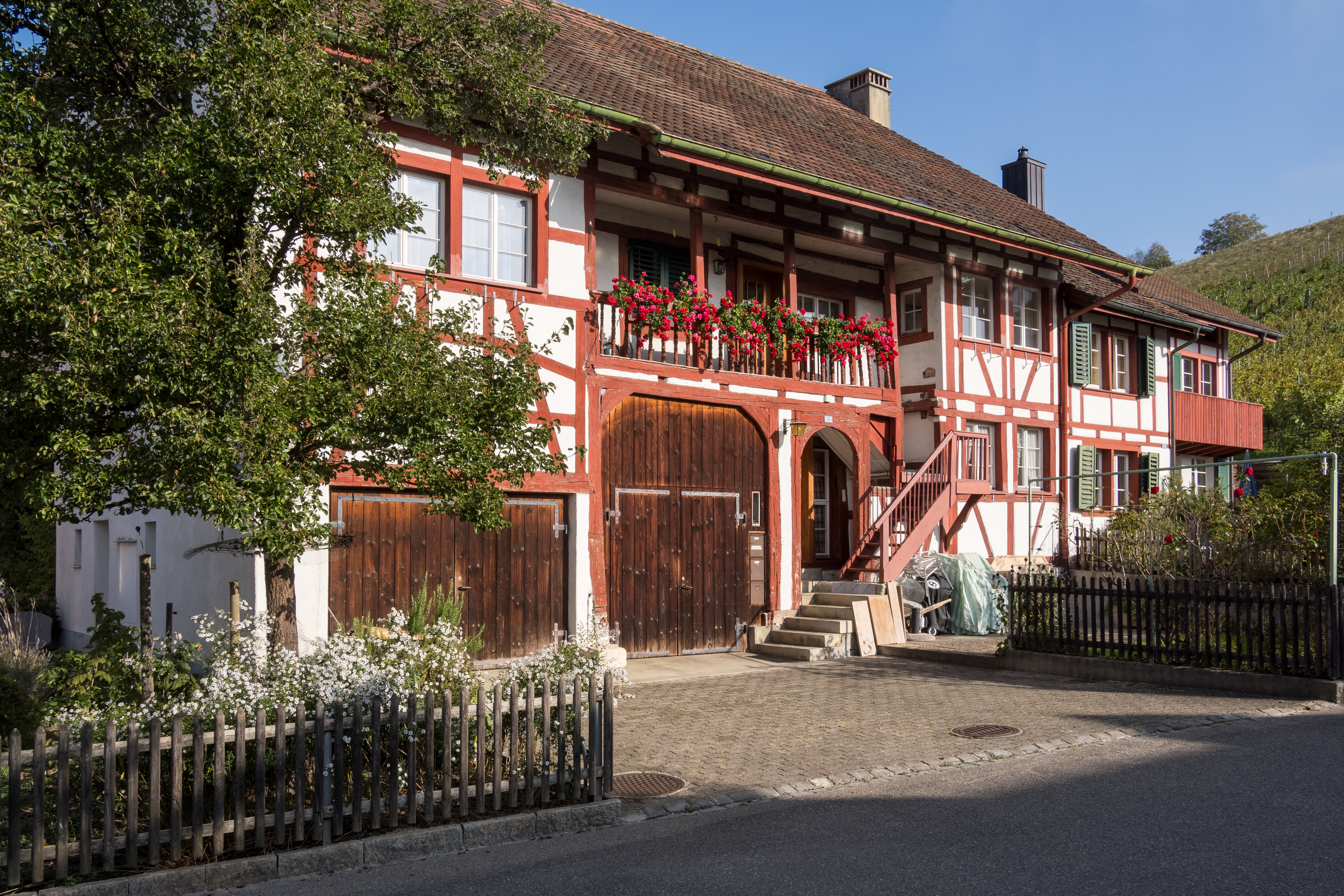
Former winegrowers' house in Dachsen

In the 2007 election the most popular party was the SVP which received 35.2% of the vote. The next three most popular parties were the SPS (18.8%), the Green Party (12.8%) and the FDP (11.1%).

The age distribution of the population (as of 2000) is children and teenagers (0–19 years old) make up 26.5% of the population, while adults (20–64 years old) make up 60% and seniors (over 64 years old) make up 13.5%. In Dachsen about 83.9% of the population (between age 25–64) have completed either non-mandatory upper secondary education or additional higher education (either university or a Fachhochschule).

Dachsen has an unemployment rate of 1.4%. As of 2005, there were 30 people employed in the primary economic sector and about 8 businesses involved in this sector. 190 people are employed in the secondary sector and there are 17 businesses in this sector. 128 people are employed in the tertiary sector, with 38 businesses in this sector.

=== Historical population ===
The historical population is given in the following graph:

== Transportation ==
Dachsen railway station is a stop of the S-Bahn Zürich on the line S33.
