= Stammheim, Zurich =

Stammheim
- Municipality
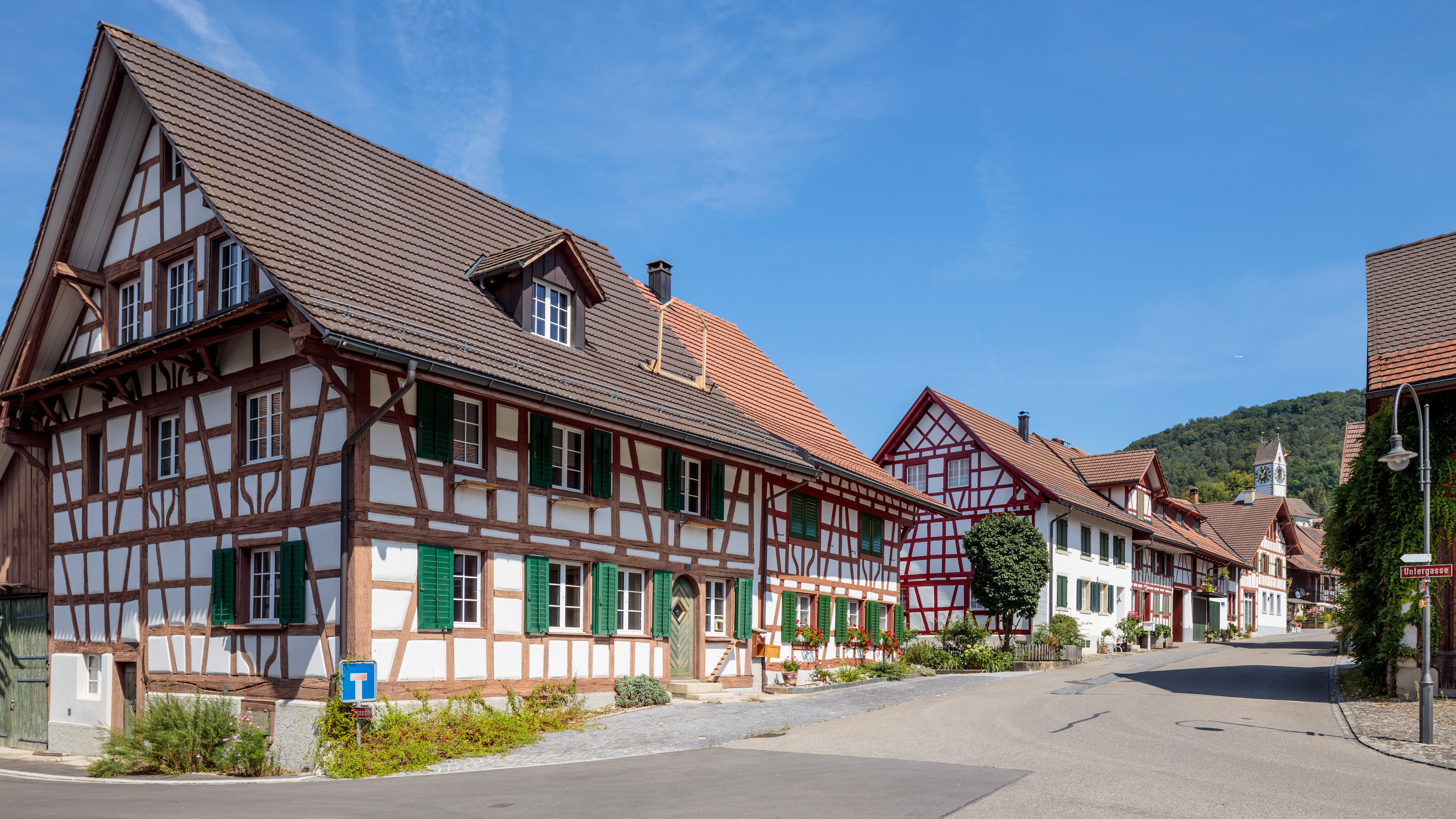

- Flag Coat of arms
- Location of Stammheim
- Location within Switzerland Location within Canton of Zurich
- Coordinates: 47°38′N 8°47′E
- Country: Switzerland
- Canton: Zurich
- District: Andelfingen

Area
  - Total: 23.95 km^{2} (9.25 sq mi)

Population (December 2020)
  - Total: 2,859
  - Density: 119.4/km^{2} (309.2/sq mi)
- Time zone: UTC+01:00 (CET)
  - Summer (DST): UTC+02:00 (CEST)
- Postal code: 8476, 77, 68
- SFOS number: 292
- ISO 3166 code: CH-ZH
- Surrounded by: Basadingen-Schlattingen (TG), Diessenhofen (TG), Wagenhausen (TG)
- Website: https://www.stammheim.ch/

Stammheim (German pronunciation: [ˈʃtamhaɪm]) is a municipality in the district of Andelfingen in the canton of Zürich in Switzerland. On 1 January 2019 the former municipalities of Oberstammheim, Unterstammheim and Waltalingen merged into the new municipality of Stammheim.

== History ==
=== Oberstammheim ===
In 2009, archaeologists announced the discovery of an Iron Age (late Hallstatt or early La Tène) tumulus burial, apparently of a Celtic nobleman. While there are comparable finds in Germany, the site is unique in Switzerland.

Oberstammheim is first mentioned in 761 as Stamhaim. In 1212 it was mentioned as in Stamehein superiori.

== Geography ==
After the merger, Stammheim has an area, as of 2009, of 23.95 km^{2} (9.25 sq mi).

== Demographics ==
The new municipality has a population (as of December 2020) of 2,859.

Aerial view (1964)

== Historic Population ==
The historical population is given in the following chart:
