= Unterstammheim =

- Former municipality
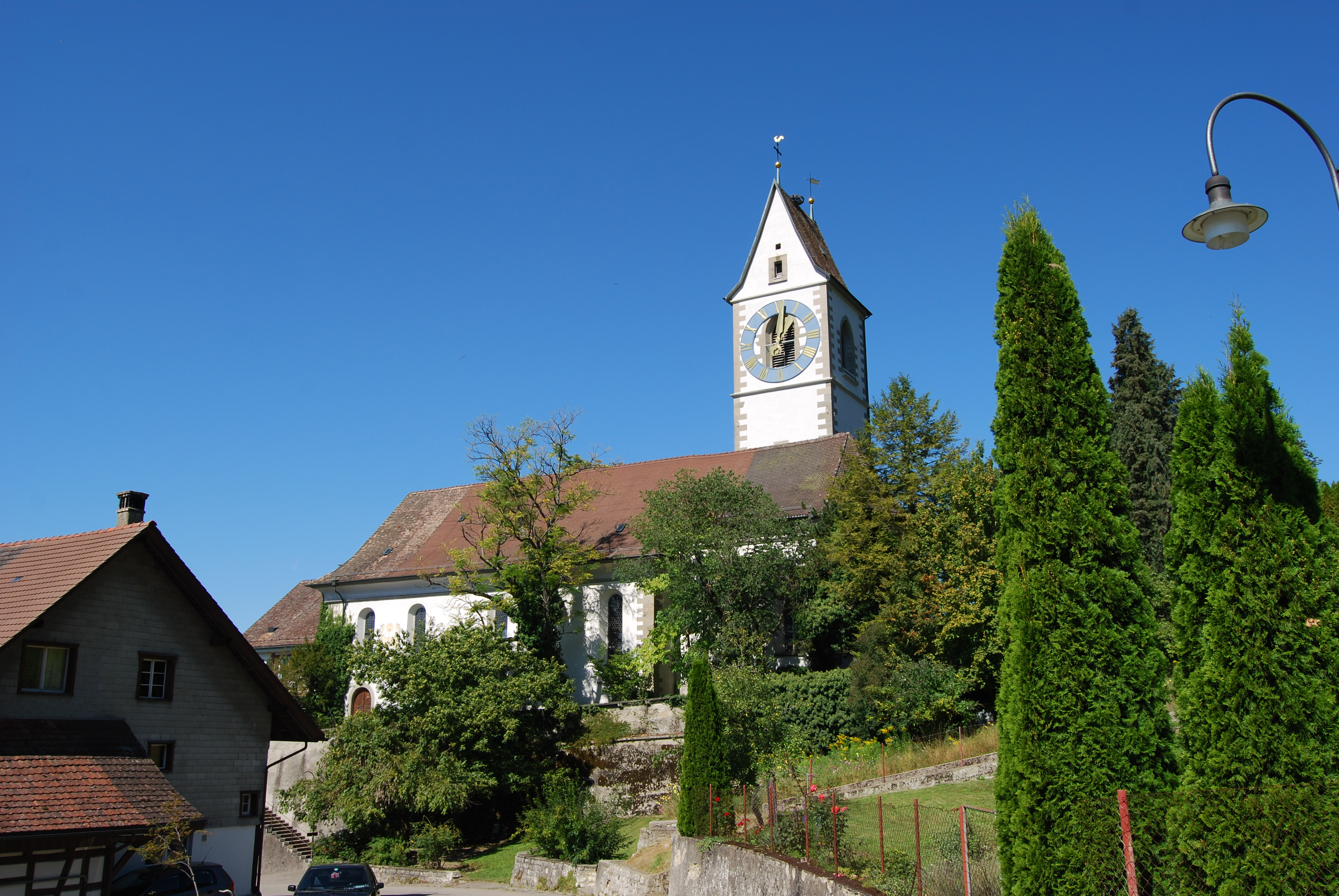

- Flag Coat of arms
- Location of Unterstammheim
- Location within Switzerland Location within Canton of Zurich
- Coordinates: 47°38′N 8°47′E
- Country: Switzerland
- Canton: Zurich
- District: Andelfingen

Area
  - Total: 7.32 km^{2} (2.83 sq mi)
- Elevation: 433 m (1,421 ft)

Population (December 2020)
  - Total: 928
  - Density: 127/km^{2} (328/sq mi)
- Time zone: UTC+01:00 (CET)
  - Summer (DST): UTC+02:00 (CEST)
- Postal code: 8476
- SFOS number: 42
- ISO 3166 code: CH-ZH
- Surrounded by: Basadingen-Schlattingen (TG), Diessenhofen (TG), Oberstammheim, Wagenhausen (TG), Waltalingen
- Website: www.unterstammheim.ch

Unterstammheim is a former municipality in the district of Andelfingen in the canton of Zürich in Switzerland. On 1 January 2019 the former municipalities of Oberstammheim, Unterstammheim and Waltalingen merged into the new municipality of Stammheim.

== Geography ==
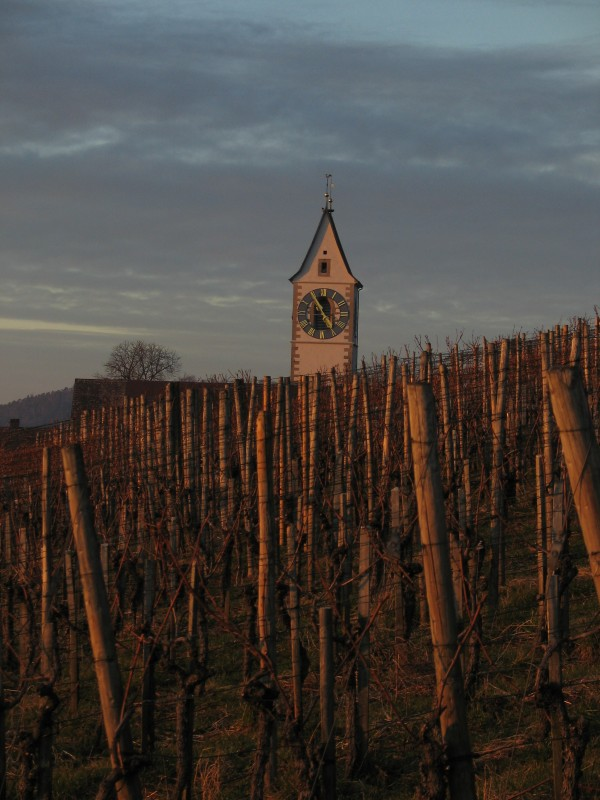
Unterstammheim church

Unterstammheim has an area of 7.3 km^{2} (2.8 sq mi). Of this area, 52.8% is used for agricultural purposes, while 36.2% is forested. Of the rest of the land, 10.6% is settled (buildings or roads) and the remainder (0.4%) is non-productive (rivers, glaciers or mountains).

Aerial view (1948)

== Demographics ==
Unterstammheim has a population (as of 31 December 2020) of 928. As of 2007, 7.0% of the population was made up of foreign nationals. Over the last 10 years the population has decreased at a rate of -0.3%. Most of the population (as of 2000) speaks German (96.1%), with Albanian being second most common ( 1.8%) and Portuguese being third ( 0.6%).

In the 2007 election the most popular party was the SVP which received 35.7% of the vote. The next three most popular parties were the CSP (16.5%), the FDP (13.5%) and the Green Party (13.3%).

The age distribution of the population (as of 2000) is children and teenagers (0–19 years old) make up 30.4% of the population, while adults (20–64 years old) make up 55.7% and seniors (over 64 years old) make up 13.8%. In Unterstammheim about 84.3% of the population (between age 25-64) have completed either non-mandatory upper secondary education or additional higher education (either university or a Fachhochschule).

Unterstammheim has an unemployment rate of 1.54%. As of 2005, there were 116 people employed in the primary economic sector and about 30 businesses involved in this sector. 83 people are employed in the secondary sector and there are 11 businesses in this sector. 234 people are employed in the tertiary sector, with 37 businesses in this sector.

== Transport ==
Stammheim railway station, situated in Unterstammheim, is served by Zurich S-Bahn line S29, which links Winterthur and Stein am Rhein.
