= Oberstammheim =

- Former municipality
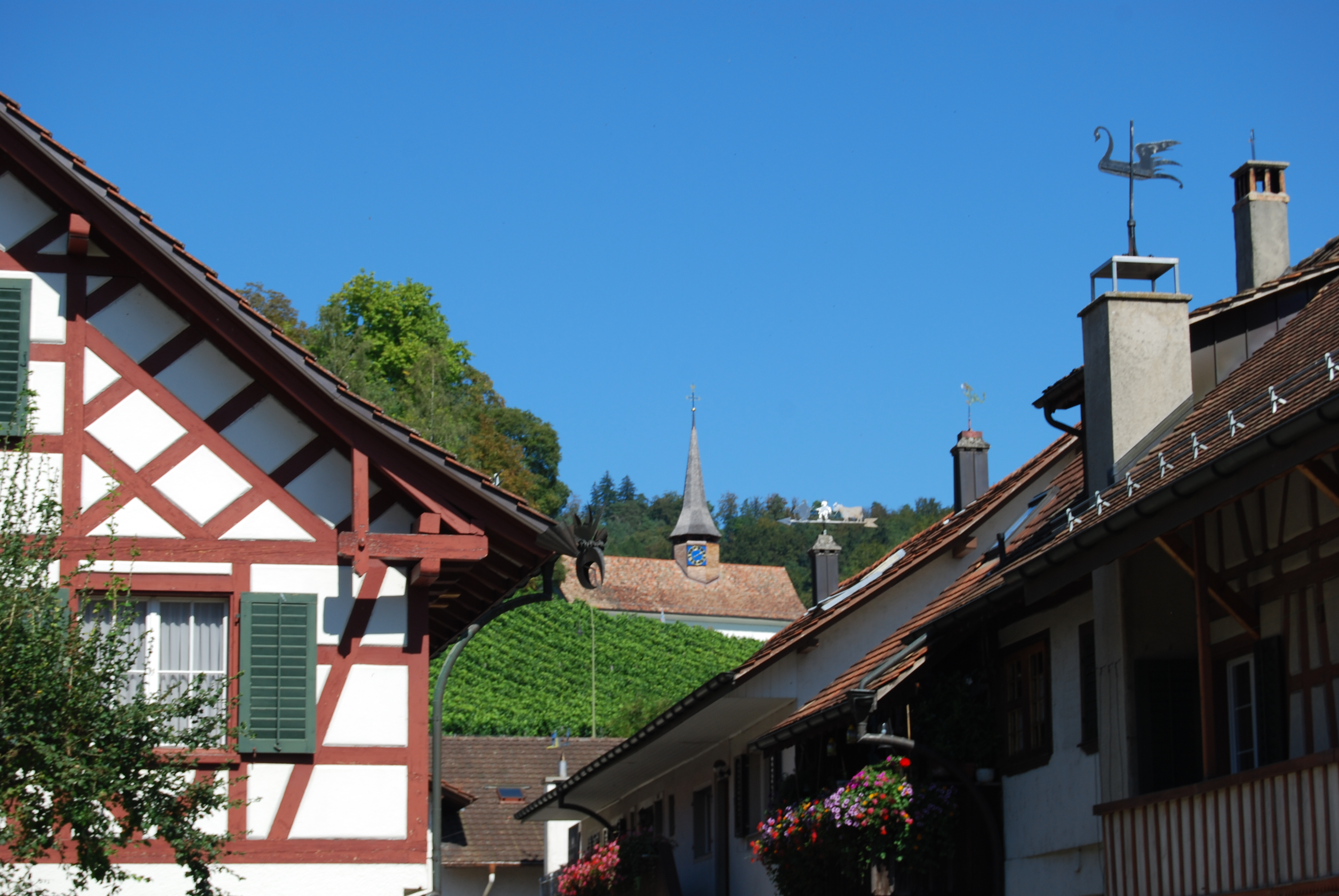

- Flag Coat of arms
- Location of Oberstammheim
- Location within Switzerland Location within Canton of Zürich
- Coordinates: 47°38′N 8°48′E
- Country: Switzerland
- Canton: Zürich
- District: Andelfingen

Area
  - Total: 9.36 km^{2} (3.61 sq mi)
- Elevation: 440 m (1,440 ft)

Population (December 2020)
  - Total: 1,164
  - Density: 124/km^{2} (322/sq mi)
- Time zone: UTC+01:00 (CET)
  - Summer (DST): UTC+02:00 (CEST)
- Postal code: 8477
- SFOS number: 36
- ISO 3166 code: CH-ZH
- Surrounded by: Hüttwilen (TG), Neunforn (TG), Unterstammheim, Wagenhausen (TG), Waltalingen
- Website: www.oberstammheim.ch

Oberstammheim is a former municipality in the district of Andelfingen in the canton of Zürich in Switzerland.

== History ==
In 2009, archaeologists announced the discovery of an Iron Age (late Hallstatt or early La Tène) tumulus burial, apparently of a Celtic nobleman. While there are comparable finds in Germany, the site is unique in Switzerland.

Oberstammheim is first mentioned in 761 as Stamhaim. In 1212 it was mentioned as in Stamehein superiori.

On 1 January 2019 the former municipalities of Oberstammheim, Unterstammheim and Waltalingen merged into the new municipality of Stammheim.

Aerial view (1956)

== Geography ==
Oberstammheim has an area of 9.4 km^{2} (3.6 sq mi). Of this area, 54.9% is used for agricultural purposes, while 36.7% is forested. Of the rest of the land, 8.2% is settled (buildings or roads) and the remainder (0.2%) is non-productive (rivers, glaciers or mountains).

The municipality is located in the Züricher Weinland on the border with the canton of Thurgau on the southern slope of the Stammerberg. It includes the village of Oberstammheim and the Zürich part of the hamlet of Wilen bei Neunforn. For a short time (1853–86) Wilen bei Neunforn, together with the Thurgau section of the hamlet, formed a Zivilgemeinde (civil community).

== Demographics ==
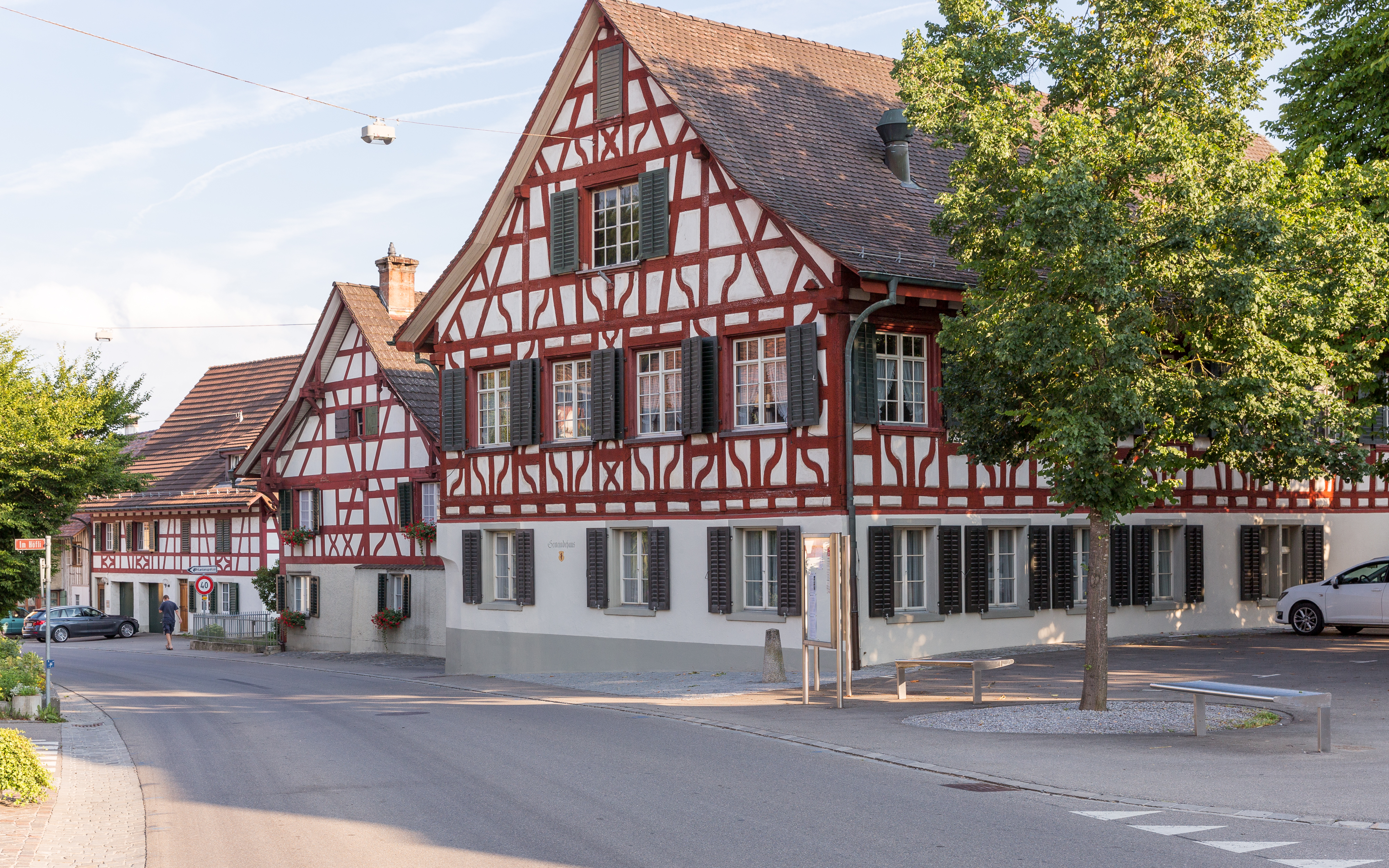
Main street with "Gemeindehaus" (local government and municipal administration)

Oberstammheim has a population (as of 31 December 2020) of 1,164. As of 2007, 5.7% of the population was made up of foreign nationals. Over the last 10 years the population has grown at a rate of 2.4%. Most of the population (as of 2000) speaks German (97.2%), with French being second most common ( 0.7%) and Italian being third ( 0.7%).

In the 2007 election the most popular party was the SVP which received 41.1% of the vote. The next three most popular parties were the FDP (16.2%), the SPS (14%) and the Green Party (10.9%).

The age distribution of the population (as of 2000) is children and teenagers (0–19 years old) make up 28.6% of the population, while adults (20–64 years old) make up 53.5% and seniors (over 64 years old) make up 18%. In Oberstammheim about 85% of the population (between age 25-64) have completed either non-mandatory upper secondary education or additional higher education (either university or a Fachhochschule).

Oberstammheim has an unemployment rate of 0.68%. As of 2005, there were 93 people employed in the primary economic sector and about 34 businesses involved in this sector. 56 people are employed in the secondary sector and there are 13 businesses in this sector. 213 people are employed in the tertiary sector, with 34 businesses in this sector. The historical population is given in the following table:

year	population
1467	44 Households
1637	359
1663	577
1695	529
1746	587
1850	989
1900	818
1950	758
2000	1,064

== Transport ==
Stammheim railway station, situated in the neighbouring municipality of Unterstammheim, is served by Zürich S-Bahn line S29, which links Winterthur and Stein am Rhein.

== Notable people ==
Isabelle Waldberg (1911-1990), sculptor was born in Oberstammheim.
