= Uerschhausen =

Village in Thurgau, Switzerland

- Former municipality
- Aerial view
- Location of Uerschhausen
- Location within Switzerland Location within Canton of Thurgau
- Coordinates: 47.6086°N 8.8181°E
- Country: Switzerland
- Canton: Thurgau
- District: Steckborn
- Municipality: Hüttwilen

Population (1990)
  - Total: 99
- Time zone: UTC+01:00 (CET)
  - Summer (DST): UTC+02:00 (CEST)
- ISO 3166 code: CH-TG
- Website

Uerschhausen is a former Ortsgemeinde (local commune) in the canton of Thurgau, Switzerland, which has been part of the municipality of Hüttwilen since 1997. As an Ortsgemeinde it belonged to the Munizipalgemeinde (municipal commune) of Eschenz from 1803 to 1851 and to that of Hüttwilen from 1851 to 1996. The well-preserved farming village lies on the Nussbaumersee in the Seebach valley (Seebachtal). Remains of several prehistoric settlements, from the Neolithic to the Iron Age, have been found in the lake and on its Horn peninsula.

== Prehistory ==
The oldest evidence of human presence in the Seebach valley dates from the Mesolithic (9000–5500 BC) and comes from nomadic hunter-gatherers who pitched their camps in the lake area; the finds are exclusively flint artifacts. Pollen analysis shows that crops were already being grown around Uerschhausen in the second half of the 5th millennium BC, in the Middle Neolithic, although the settlement site is still unknown. The oldest known settlement lies in the Nussbaumersee and belonged to the Pfyn culture. The village was built around 3840 BC; the last building work took place in 3582 BC. After a long interruption the site was settled again during the Horgen culture (3300–2700 BC). A single pit-house is known from the following Corded Ware period. At the transition from the Early to the Middle Bronze Age (16th century BC) the same site was settled once more.

The most important settlement lies on the Horn peninsula and dates from the latest Bronze Age (about 850–800 BC). The settlement area, extensively excavated in 1985–1990, covers nearly 10,000 m^{2} and probably had more than 100 buildings. The houses examined were small buildings at most 6 m long, used almost exclusively as dwellings; there is no evidence of stables. The village was probably abandoned around 800 BC because the water level of the Nussbaumersee was rising steadily, after it had first been systematically cleared. In the Early Iron Age buildings were again put up on the southern edge of the Late Bronze Age settlement area (tree-ring dates between 660 and 635 BC).

== History ==
Uerschhausen is first mentioned in 1212 as Urreshusin. Early medieval burial mounds have been found in the village. In the Middle Ages the monasteries of St. Gallen and St. Katharinental owned property in Uerschhausen. In 1317 Pope John XXII issued a bull because people from Uerschhausen had seized property of St. Katharinental. Helfenberg Castle, mentioned in 1331, was already a ruin by 1413. Until about 1490 Uerschhausen belonged to the lordship of Ittingen, and then until 1798 to the Hohe Gerichte (high courts) of the Thurgau bailiwick (Landvogtei). In church matters Uerschhausen shared the fate of the parish of Stammheim; since 1828 Nussbaumen and Uerschhausen have formed a Reformed parish. The Catholics have belonged to Uesslingen since the Reformation of 1524. The farming economy and settlement pattern hardly changed in the 20th century.

Uerschhausen had 156 inhabitants in 1850, 114 in 1900, 102 in 1930, 140 in 1950 and 99 in 1990.

== Bibliography ==
- A. Hasenfratz and M. Schnyder, Das Seebachtal, 1998
- Die Kunstdenkmäler des Kantons Thurgau, vol. 6, 2001, pp. 188 f.
- Archäologie im Thurgau, 2010, pp. 304–308
- Thurgauer Zeitung, 5 April 2011
