= Nussbaumen, Thurgau =

Village in Thurgau, Switzerland

Nussbaumen
- Former municipality
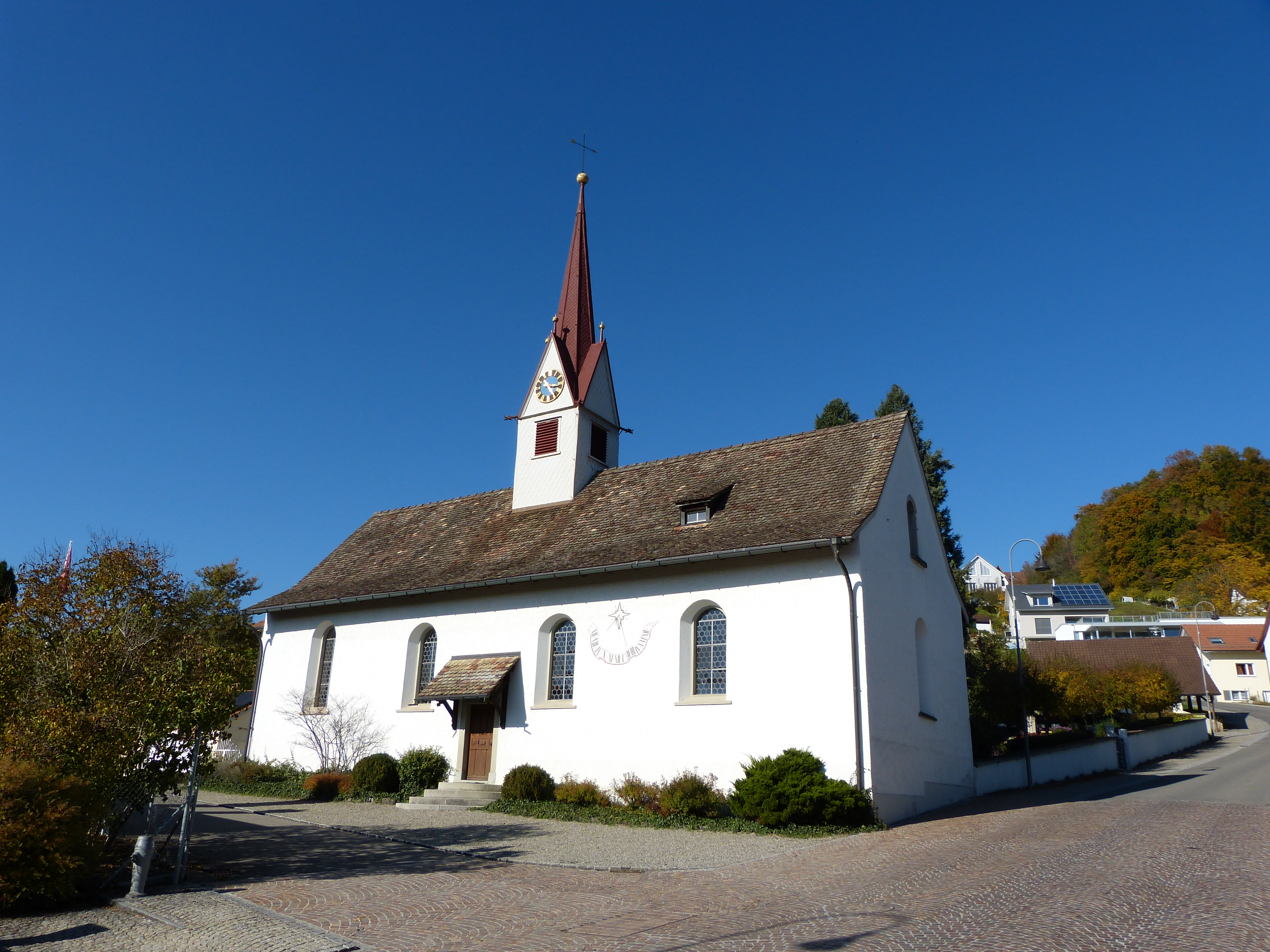
- Reformed church
- Location of Nussbaumen
- Location within Switzerland Location within Canton of Thurgau
- Coordinates: 47.6261°N 8.8288°E
- Country: Switzerland
- Canton: Thurgau
- District: Steckborn
- Municipality: Hüttwilen

Population (1990)
  - Total: 456
- Time zone: UTC+01:00 (CET)
  - Summer (DST): UTC+02:00 (CEST)
- ISO 3166 code: CH-TG
- Website

Nussbaumen is a former Ortsgemeinde (local commune) in the canton of Thurgau, Switzerland, now part of the municipality of Hüttwilen. The village lies in the Seebach valley (Seebachtal). From 1803 to 1851 Nussbaumen, together with Steinegg from 1812, belonged to the Munizipalgemeinde (municipal commune) of Eschenz; after that municipal commune was divided, Nussbaumen was part of the Munizipalgemeinde of Hüttwilen until 1996.

== History ==
Nussbaumen is first mentioned in 857 as Nuzpouma. In 1162 the tithe of Nussbaumen passed to the Abbey of Saint Gall. In 1216 Diethelm von Steinegg exercised the low jurisdiction in the Vogtei (bailiwick) of Nussbaumen. In 1348 the Vogtei belonged to Hartmann von Gachnang, and in the 15th century to the lords of Klingenberg, among others. In 1583 Zurich acquired Nussbaumen and had it administered by the Obervogt (bailiff) of Steinegg until 1798.

Because Nussbaumen belonged to the parish of Stammheim until 1828, the chapel of Saint Leonard, built around 1000, long remained out of use after the Reformation of 1524. In 1828 Nussbaumen and Uerschhausen formed a parish together.

The commune owned land in the Schomat forest and peat land (Turbenland). Around 1750 the inhabitants grew hemp and vines; in the 20th century tobacco growing began and large land improvement schemes (Meliorationen) were carried out. There were six embroidery works in 1897 and thirteen in 1912, as well as a mill. At the beginning of the 21st century Nussbaumen had a belt factory and a tree nursery.

Nussbaumen had 458 inhabitants in 1850, 372 in 1900, 356 in 1950 and 456 in 1990.

== Bibliography ==
- A. Vögeli, Nussbaumen 858–1958, 1958
- Die Kunstdenkmäler des Kantons Thurgau, vol. 6, 2001, pp. 176–193
