= Steckborn District =

Coordinates: 47°40′N 8°59′E

Steckborn District Bezirk Steckborn
- District
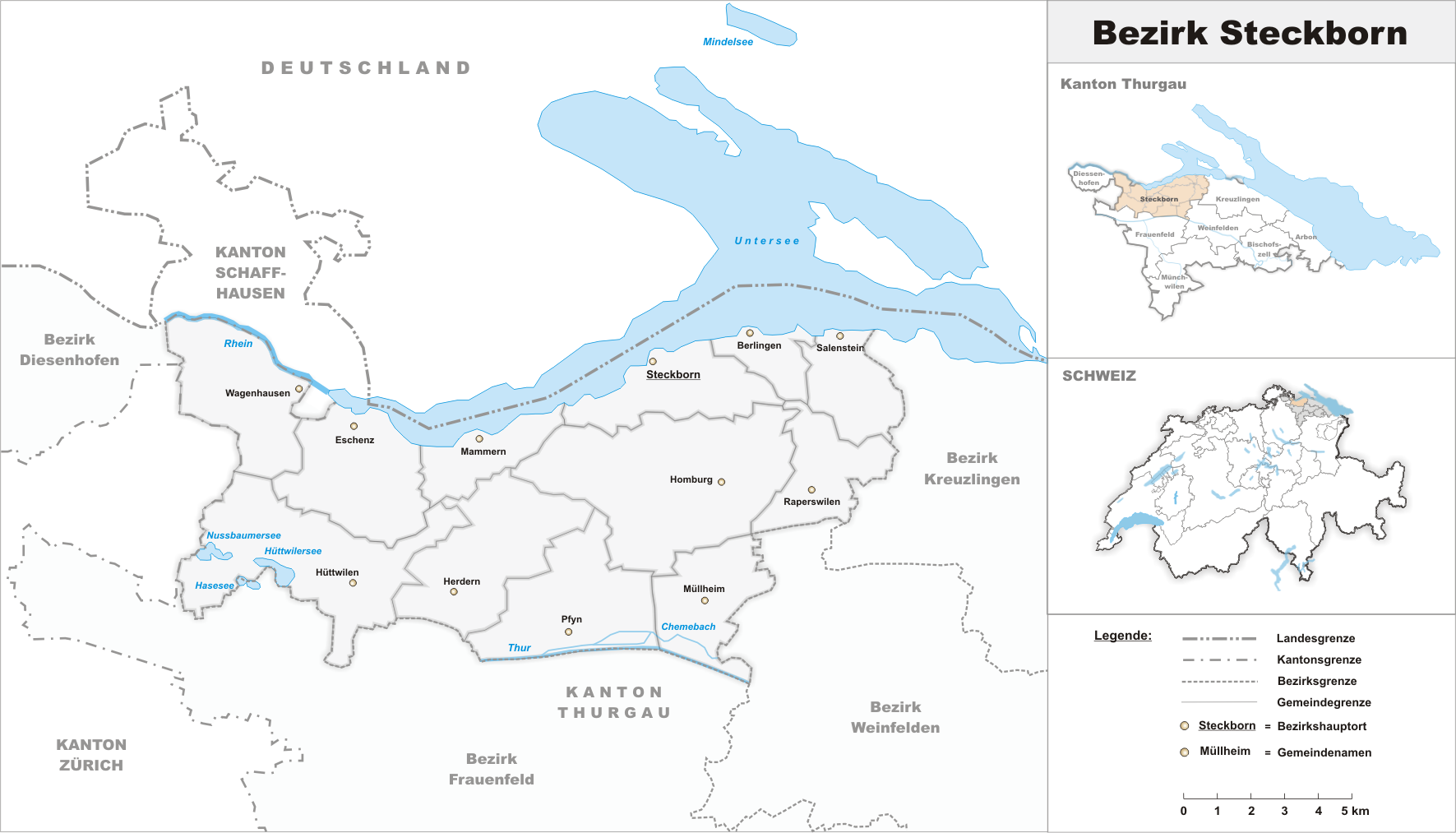
- Country: Switzerland
- Canton: Thurgau
- Capital: Steckborn

Area
  - Total: 132.9 km^{2} (51.3 sq mi)

Population (2009)
  - Total: 18,215
  - Density: 137.1/km^{2} (355.0/sq mi)
- Time zone: UTC+1 (CET)
  - Summer (DST): UTC+2 (CEST)
- Municipalities: 15

Steckborn District is a former district of the canton of Thurgau, Switzerland. It had a population of 18,215 (as of 2009). Its capital was the town of Steckborn.

The former district contained the following municipalities:

Coat of arms	Municipality	Population (31 December 2020)	Area km^{2}
Berlingen	Berlingen	906	4.0
Eschenz	Eschenz	1,868	12.0
Herdern	Herdern	1,117	13.7
Homburg	Homburg	1,543	24.1
Hüttwilen	Hüttwilen	1,765	17.6
Mammern	Mammern	677	5.5
Müllheim	Müllheim	3,002	8.7
Pfyn	Pfyn	2,103	13.0
Raperswilen	Raperswilen	416	7.7
Salenstein	Salenstein	1,411	6.6
Steckborn	Steckborn	3,840	8.8
Wagenhausen	Wagenhausen	1,770	11.2
