= Nussbaumersee =

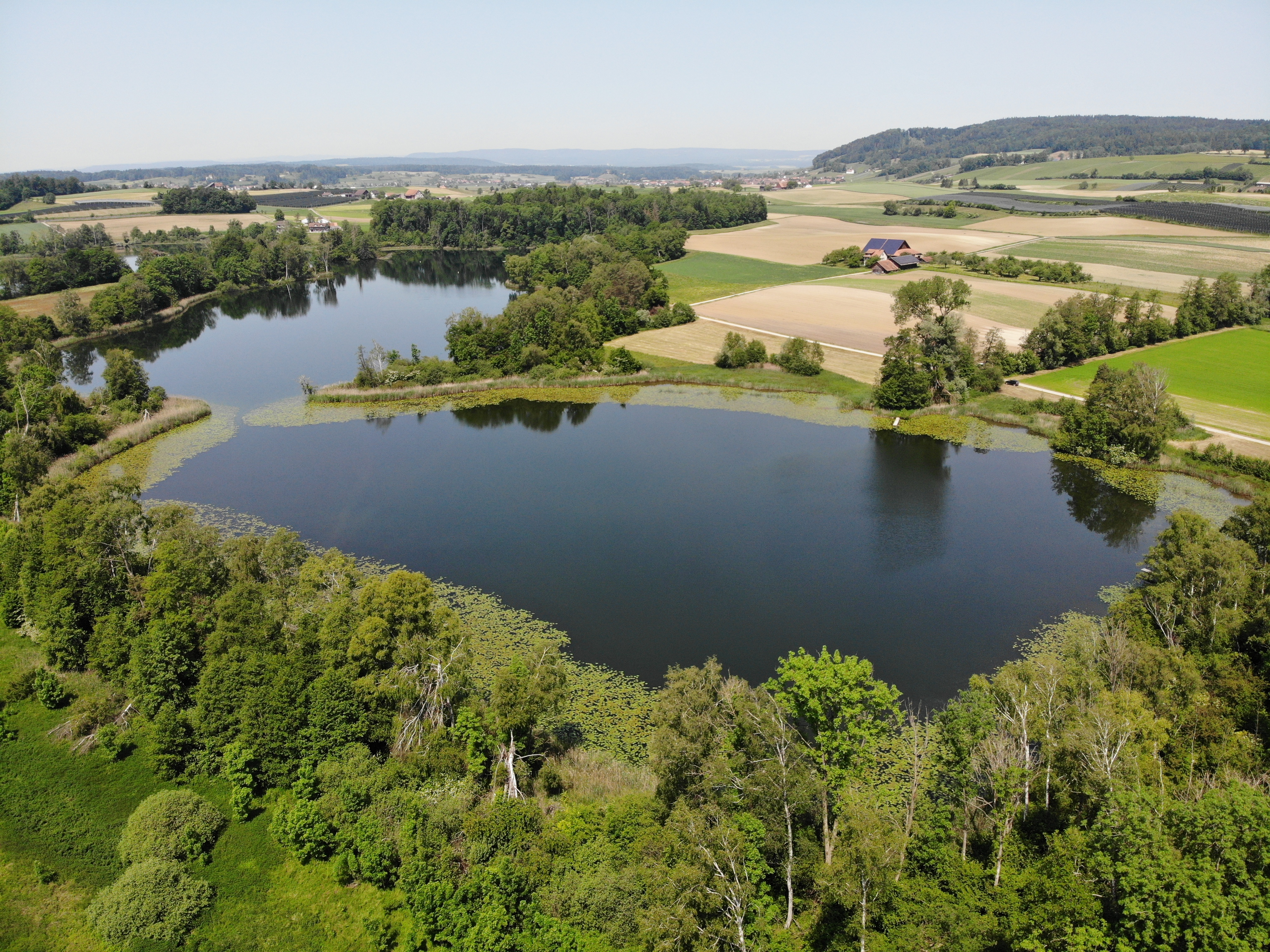

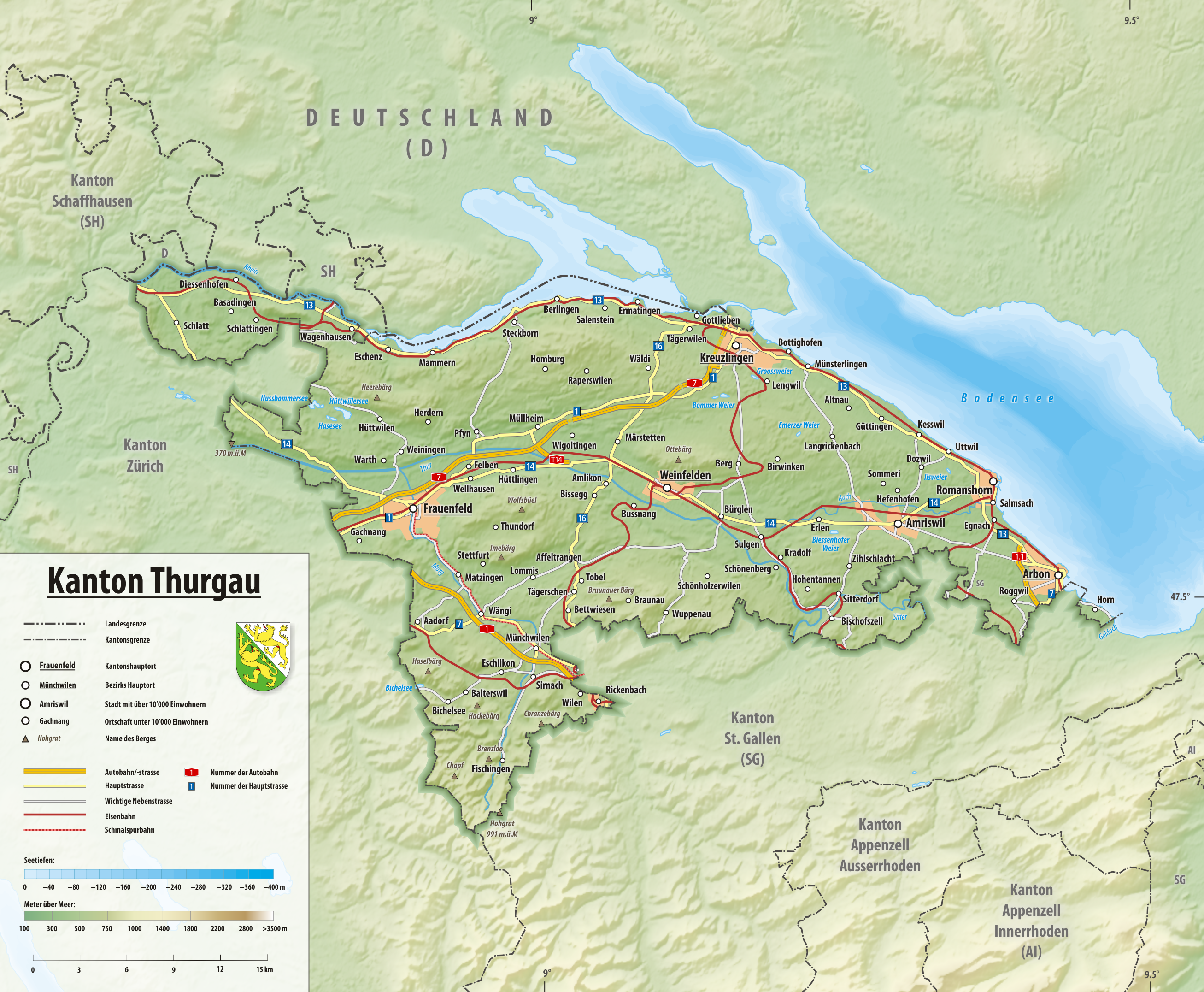
- Location within Canton of Thurgau Location within Switzerland Location within Alps
- Interactive map of Nussbaumersee
- Location: Hüttwilen, Thurgau
- Coordinates: 47°36′58″N 8°49′02″E
- Primary inflows: Furtbach
- Primary outflows: (into Hüttwilersee)
- Basin countries: Switzerland
- Surface area: 0.252 km^{2} (0.097 sq mi)
- Average depth: 3.9 m (13 ft)
- Max. depth: 7.9 m (26 ft)
- Water volume: 1,067,000 m^{3} (865 acre⋅ft)
- Surface elevation: 433.91 m (1,423.6 ft)
- Islands: 1

UNESCO World Heritage Site
- Part of: Prehistoric pile dwellings around the Alps
- Criteria: Cultural: (iv), (v)
- Reference: 1363-036
- Inscription: 2011 (35th Session)
- Area: 3.66 ha (9.0 acres)
- Buffer zone: 16.86 ha (41.7 acres)

Nussbaumersee is a small lake between Nussbaumen and Uerschhausen, both in the municipality of Hüttwilen in the Canton of Thurgau, Switzerland. It lies at an altitude of 434 metres above sea level, and its surface area is 25.2 ha (62 acres). The lake has one small island. Hüttwilersee and Hasensee are located in the same valley.

Nussbaumer See is also known as Nussbommersee, Werdsee or Wertsee, Uerschhauser See or unterer See (lower lake). Together with Hasensee, they formed the Helfenberger Seen or Ittinger Seen.
