= Hüttwilen =

- Municipality
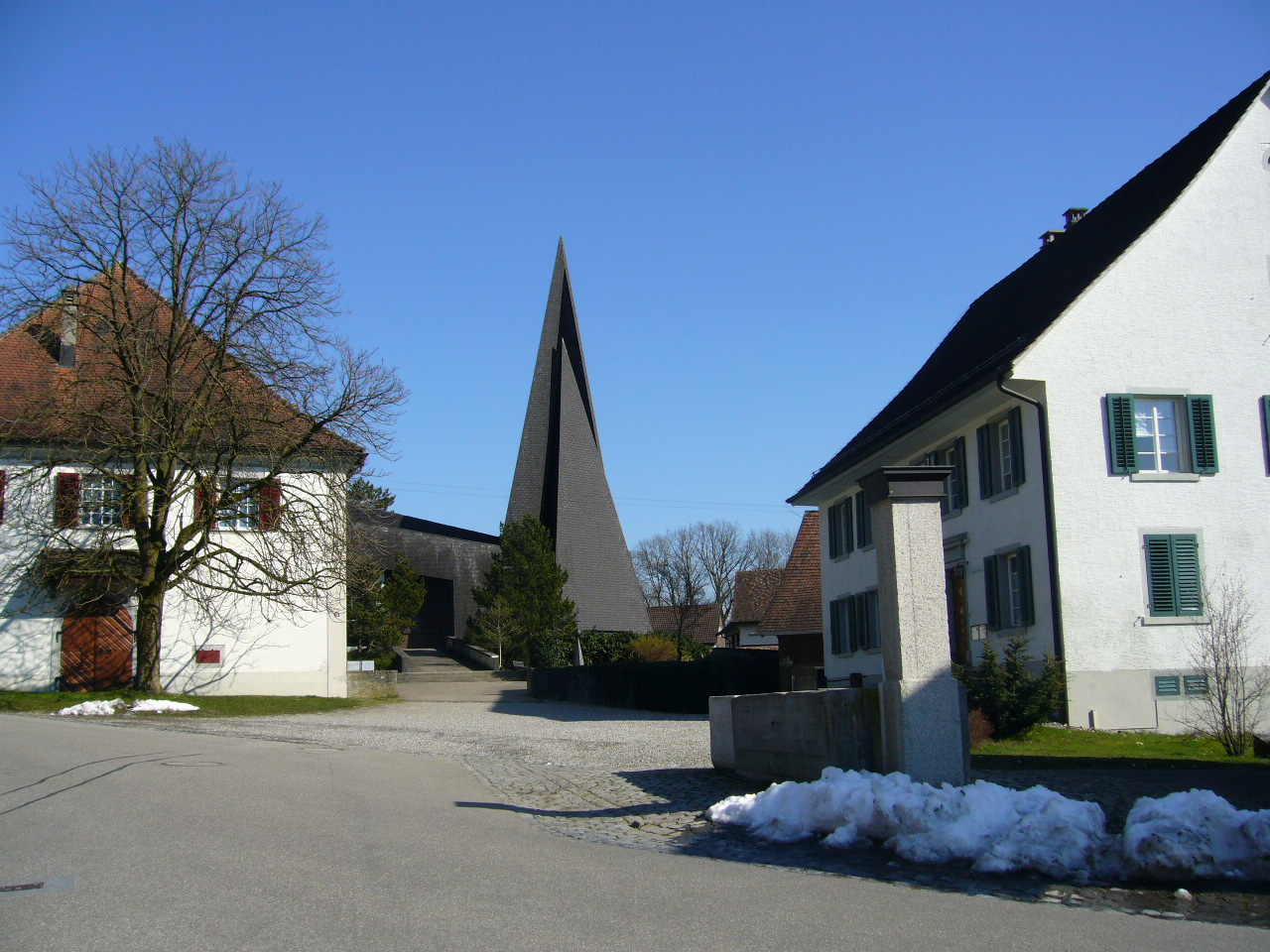

- Coat of arms
- Location of Hüttwilen
- Location within Switzerland Location within Canton of Thurgau
- Coordinates: 47°36′N 8°52′E
- Country: Switzerland
- Canton: Thurgau
- District: Frauenfeld

Area
  - Total: 17.6 km^{2} (6.8 sq mi)
- Elevation: 455 m (1,493 ft)

Population (December 2007)
  - Total: 1,416
  - Density: 80.5/km^{2} (208/sq mi)
- Time zone: UTC+01:00 (CET)
  - Summer (DST): UTC+02:00 (CEST)
- Postal code: 8536
- SFOS number: 4821
- ISO 3166 code: CH-TG
- Localities: Hüttwilen, Nussbaumen, Uerschhausen
- Surrounded by: Eschenz, Herdern, Mammern, Neunforn, Oberstammheim (ZH), Uesslingen-Buch, Wagenhausen, Warth-Weiningen
- Website: huettwilen.ch

Hüttwilen is a municipality in Frauenfeld District in the canton of Thurgau in Switzerland.

== History ==
Archeological sites and scattered, individual items indicate that there was a Mesolithic settlement in the Seebachtal near Hüttwilen. In 1928, a Roman-era estate was discovered in Stutheien which proves that there was a Roman settlement in the area. The modern municipality of Hüttwilen is first mentioned in 1255 as Hutewiler.

In 1466 the village came the rule of the Carthusian monastery at Ittingen. The monastery held the majority of the lower court authority over the village until 1798.

In 1466 the church was built in the village, under the monastery's authority. During the Protestant Reformation in 1529 the village converted to the new faith. The Catholic nobles in the village were able to reinstate the Catholic Mass at the church in 1551. Until 1961 the church was used by both denominations. In 1962 a new Reformed church was built. It was followed in 1964 by a Catholic church. Starting in 1551 the chapel in Uesslingen has been a branch of the Hüttwilen Reformed parish.

Aerial view (1954)

For most of the village's history, the main economic activities were wine production, farming and fruit growing. Then, in the late 19th century livestock and dairy farming were added. In 1900 a hand embroidery plant opened, and into the 20th century peat was produced. The Seebachkorrektion (Seebach river correction) of 1857–62, and the land improvement projects of 1943-49 opened up new agricultural land. Agriculture was a significant source of income until 1960 when it began to decline in importance and was increasingly replaced by commercial companies. The largest employer is the structure and scaffolding Nussli Group., (2011: 350 employees in Hüttwilen and worldwide). In 1966 the natural and cultural landscape of the Seebach was put under protection which limited development.

== Geography ==
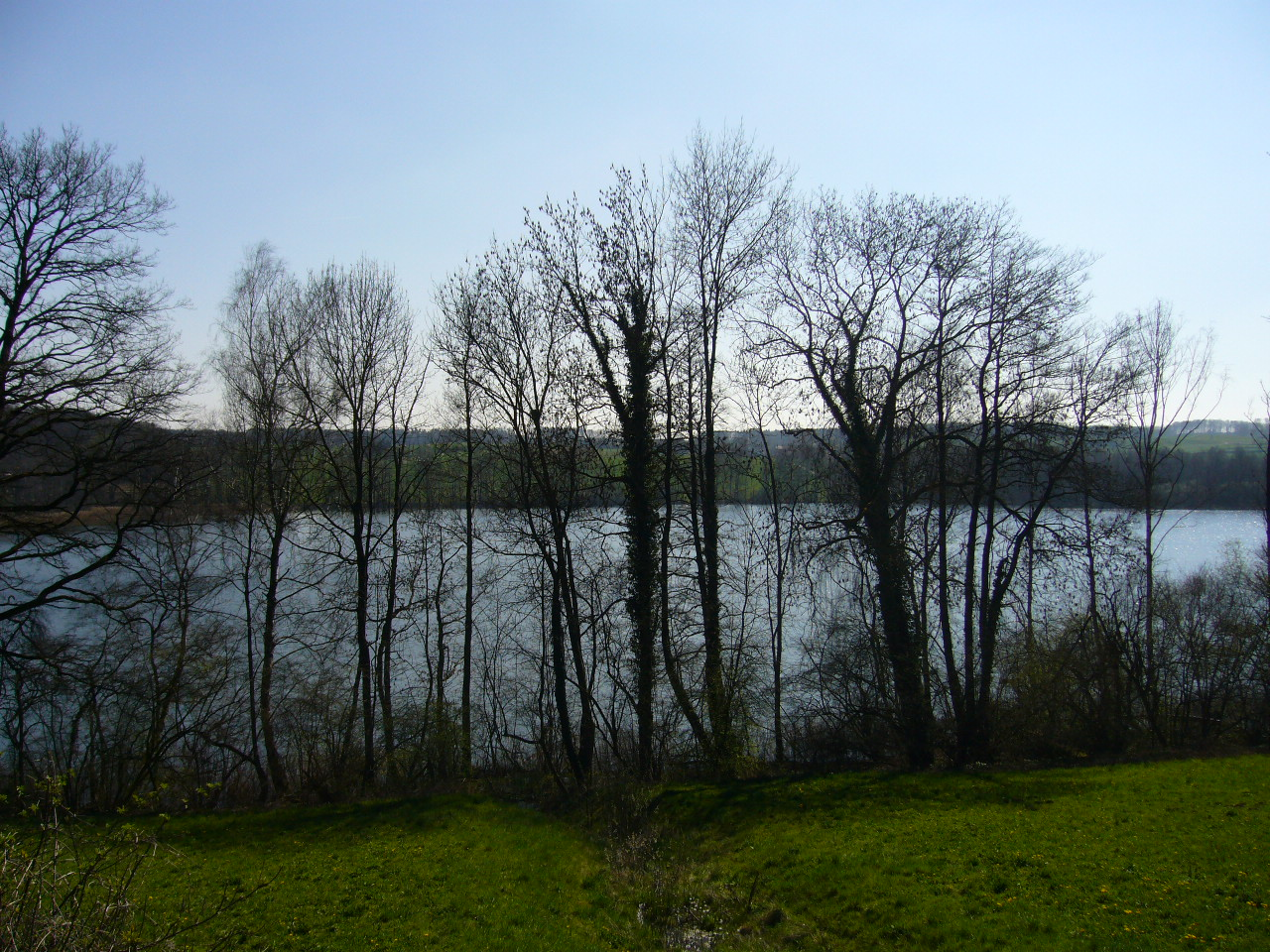
Hüttwilersee (Hüttwil lake)

Hüttwilen has an area, as of 2009, of 17.66 square kilometers (6.82 sq mi). Of this area, 10.53 km^{2} (4.07 sq mi) or 59.6% is used for agricultural purposes, while 5.39 km^{2} (2.08 sq mi) or 30.5% is forested. Of the rest of the land, 1.15 km^{2} (0.44 sq mi) or 6.5% is settled (buildings or roads), 0.59 km^{2} (0.23 sq mi) or 3.3% is either rivers or lakes and 0.02 km^{2} (4.9 acres) or 0.1% is unproductive land.

Of the built up area, industrial buildings made up 3.2% of the total area while housing and buildings made up 0.3% and transportation infrastructure made up 0.3%. while parks, green belts and sports fields made up 2.4%. Out of the forested land, 28.4% of the total land area is heavily forested and 2.2% is covered with orchards or small clusters of trees. Of the agricultural land, 54.0% is used for growing crops, while 5.6% is used for orchards or vine crops. All the water in the municipality is in lakes.

The municipality is located in Frauenfeld District, in the Seebachtal between Frauenfeld and Diessenhofen. It was formed in 1997 from the former municipal commune (Munizipalgemeinde) of Hüttwilen which included the former Ortsgemeinden of Hüttwilen (including Kalchrain), Nussbaumen and Uerschhausen.

The lakes Nussbaumersee, Hüttwilersee and Hasensee are located in the municipality.

== Demographics ==
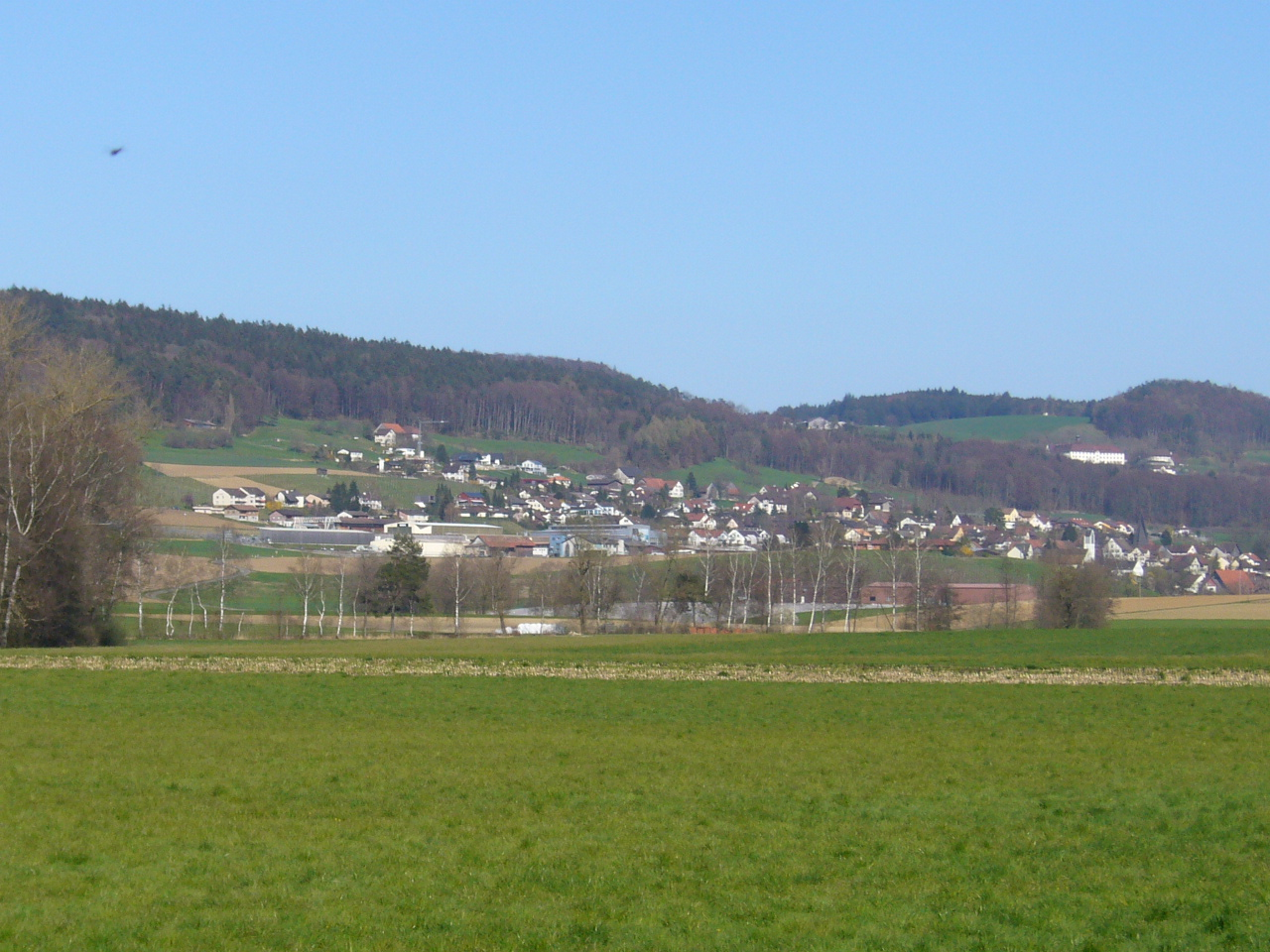
Hüttwilen

Hüttwilen has a population (as of December 2020) of 1,765. As of 2008, 7.7% of the population are foreign nationals. Over the last 10 years (1997–2007) the population has changed at a rate of 2.6%. Most of the population (as of 2000) speaks German (93.6%), with Portuguese being second most common ( 1.4%) and Albanian being third ( 1.2%).

As of 2008, the gender distribution of the population was 50.8% male and 49.2% female. The population was made up of 664 Swiss men (46.3% of the population), and 65 (4.5%) non-Swiss men. There were 659 Swiss women (46.0%), and 46 (3.2%) non-Swiss women. In 2008 there were 15 live births to Swiss citizens and 1 birth to non-Swiss citizens, and in same time span there were 12 deaths of Swiss citizens. Ignoring immigration and emigration, the population of Swiss citizens increased by 3 while the foreign population increased by 1. There were 5 Swiss men who emigrated from Switzerland to another country, 4 Swiss women who emigrated from Switzerland to another country, 3 non-Swiss men who emigrated from Switzerland to another country and 1 non-Swiss woman who emigrated from Switzerland to another country. The total Swiss population change in 2008 (from all sources) was an increase of 13 and there was no non-Swiss population change. This represents a population growth rate of 0.9%.

The age distribution, as of 2009, in Hüttwilen is; 174 children or 12.0% of the population are between 0 and 9 years old and 176 teenagers or 12.1% are between 10 and 19. Of the adult population, 153 people or 10.6% of the population are between 20 and 29 years old. 172 people or 11.9% are between 30 and 39, 241 people or 16.6% are between 40 and 49, and 237 people or 16.3% are between 50 and 59. The senior population distribution is 159 people or 11.0% of the population are between 60 and 69 years old, 87 people or 6.0% are between 70 and 79, there are 41 people or 2.8% who are between 80 and 89, and there are 10 people or 0.7% who are 90 and older.

As of 2000 the average number of residents per living room was 0.52 which is about equal to the cantonal average of 0.56 per room. In this case, a room is defined as space of a housing unit of at least 4 m^{2} (43 sq ft) as normal bedrooms, dining rooms, living rooms, kitchens and habitable cellars and attics. About 61% of the total households were owner occupied, or in other words did not pay rent (though they may have a mortgage or a rent-to-own agreement). As of 2000, there were 502 private households in the municipality, and an average of 2.6 persons per household.

In 2000 there were 250 single family homes (or 85.0% of the total) out of a total of 294 inhabited buildings. There were 27 two family buildings (9.2%), 8 three family buildings (2.7%) and 9 multi-family buildings (or 3.1%). There were 319 (or 22.8%) persons who were part of a couple without children, and 811 (or 58.0%) who were part of a couple with children. There were 52 (or 3.7%) people who lived in single parent home, while there are 14 persons who were adult children living with one or both parents, 10 persons who lived in a household made up of relatives, 2 who lived in a household made up of unrelated persons, and 72 who are either institutionalized or live in another type of collective housing. The vacancy rate for the municipality, in 2008, was 1.01%. As of 2007, the construction rate of new housing units was 7 new units per 1000 residents.

In 2000 there were 540 apartments in the municipality. There were 16 single room apartments and 167 apartments with six or more rooms. As of 2000 the average price to rent an average apartment in Hüttwilen was 1166.32 Swiss francs (CHF) per month (US$930, £520, €750 approx. exchange rate from 2000). The average rate for a one-room apartment was 377.75 CHF (US$300, £170, €240), a two-room apartment was about 609.00 CHF (US$490, £270, €390), a three-room apartment was about 879.60 CHF (US$700, £400, €560) and a six or more room apartment cost an average of 1752.05 CHF (US$1400, £790, €1120). The average apartment price in Hüttwilen was 104.5% of the national average of 1116 CHF.

In the 2007 federal election the most popular party was the SVP which received 41.85% of the vote. The next three most popular parties were the CVP (19.5%), the FDP (12.22%) and the Green Party (10.45%). In the federal election, a total of 598 votes were cast, and the voter turnout was 58.0%.

The historical population is given in the following table:

year	population
1850	1,143
1860	1,241
1870	1,260
1880	1,140
1890	1,173
1900	1,054
1950	1,084
1960	1,130
1980	1,152
1990	1,330
2000	1,398

== Heritage sites of national significance ==
The former Cistercian monastery and the prehistoric lake shore settlement at Üerschhausen are listed as Swiss heritage sites of national significance. The entire village of Nussbaumen is designated as part of the Inventory of Swiss Heritage Sites.

The prehistoric settlement at Nussbaumersee is part of the Prehistoric Pile dwellings around the Alps a UNESCO World Heritage Site.

The monastery was built in 1703-23 by two Johann Mosbruggers (father and son) and Michael Rueff following plans by Caspar Mosbruggers. Originally built on a strongly symmetric floor plan, numerous renovations have changed much of the interior. Since 1848, it has been owned by the canton and used as a school.

== Economy ==
As of 2007, Hüttwilen had an unemployment rate of 0.67%. As of 2005, there were 196 people employed in the primary economic sector and about 70 businesses involved in this sector. 225 people are employed in the secondary sector and there are 22 businesses in this sector. 262 people are employed in the tertiary sector, with 41 businesses in this sector.

In 2000 there were 1,012 workers who lived in the municipality. Of these, 441 or about 43.6% of the residents worked outside Hüttwilen while 330 people commuted into the municipality for work. There were a total of 901 jobs (of at least 6 hours per week) in the municipality. Of the working population, 7.4% used public transportation to get to work, and 47.4% used a private car.

== Religion ==
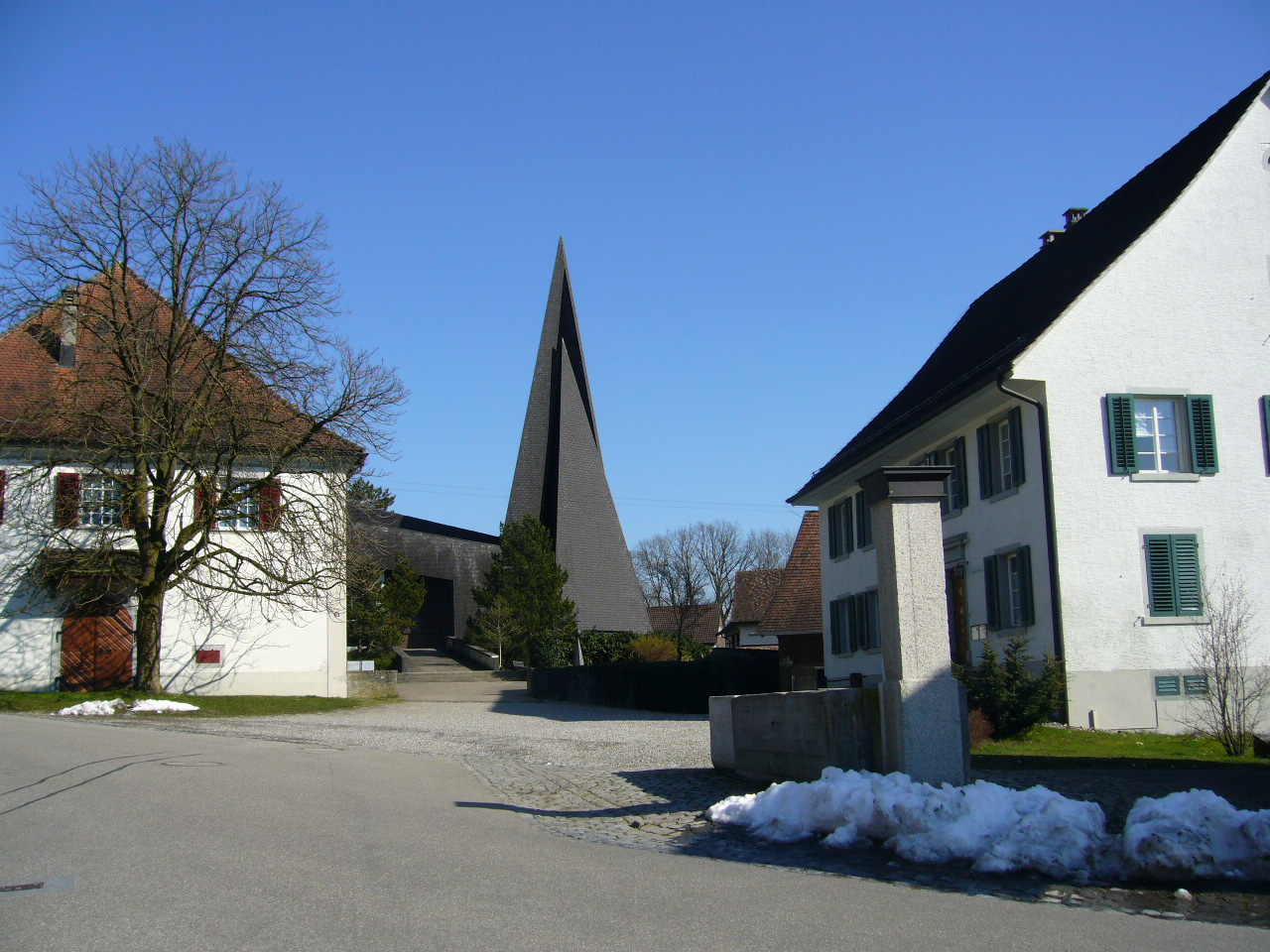
Church in Hüttwilen

From the 2000 census, 370 or 26.5% were Roman Catholic, while 790 or 56.5% belonged to the Swiss Reformed Church. Of the rest of the population, there are 6 individuals (or about 0.43% of the population) who belong to the Orthodox Church, and there are 50 individuals (or about 3.58% of the population) who belong to another Christian church. There were 22 (or about 1.57% of the population) who are Islamic. There are 3 individuals (or about 0.21% of the population) who belong to another church (not listed on the census), 111 (or about 7.94% of the population) belong to no church, are agnostic or atheist, and 46 individuals (or about 3.29% of the population) did not answer the question.

== Education ==
The entire Swiss population is generally well educated. In Hüttwilen about 77.1% of the population (between age 25–64) have completed either non-mandatory upper secondary education or additional higher education (either university or a Fachhochschule).

Hüttwilen is home to the Hüttwilen primary school district. It is also home to the Hüttwilen secondary school district.

In the primary school district there are 76 students who are in kindergarten or the primary level. There are 22 children in the kindergarten, and the average class size is 22 kindergartners. Of the children in kindergarten, 16 or 72.7% are female. The lower and upper primary levels begin at about age 5-6 and lasts for 6 years. There are 26 children in who are at the lower primary level and 28 children in the upper primary level. The average class size in the primary school is 18 students. At the lower primary level, there are 13 children or 50.0% of the total population who are female, 3 or 11.5% are not Swiss citizens and 2 or 7.7% do not speak German natively. In the upper primary level, there are 15 or 53.6% who are female, 3 or 10.7% are not Swiss citizens and 1 or 3.6% do not speak German natively.

In the secondary school district there are 184 students. They are all in special or remedial classes. Of the students, 97 or 52.7% are female, 9 or 4.9% are not Swiss citizens and 6 or 3.3% do not speak German natively.
