= Ferdinand Bach =

Swiss-American decoy carver

Ferdinand Bach (1888-1967) was a Swiss-American carver of wooden duck decoys and is considered one of the most distinguished carvers of decoys in the US.

He was born in Eschenz in Switzerland and emigrated in 1916 to the USA. He settled in St. Clair Shores where he worked as a craftsman and designer for auto manufacturing. He is best known for his wooden duck decoys; he carved about 75 decoys between 1916 and 1930, and after they were destroyed in a fire, he created another 47 decoys between 1942 and 1951. He never sold any decoys and only used them "for his own pleasure". The decoys are made of solid cedar and are wide with elaborate carving on the wings and the bills, and were carved by hand out of telephone poles.

Bach died in a boating accident in 1967.
