= Hüttwilersee =

Lake in Thurgau, Switzerland

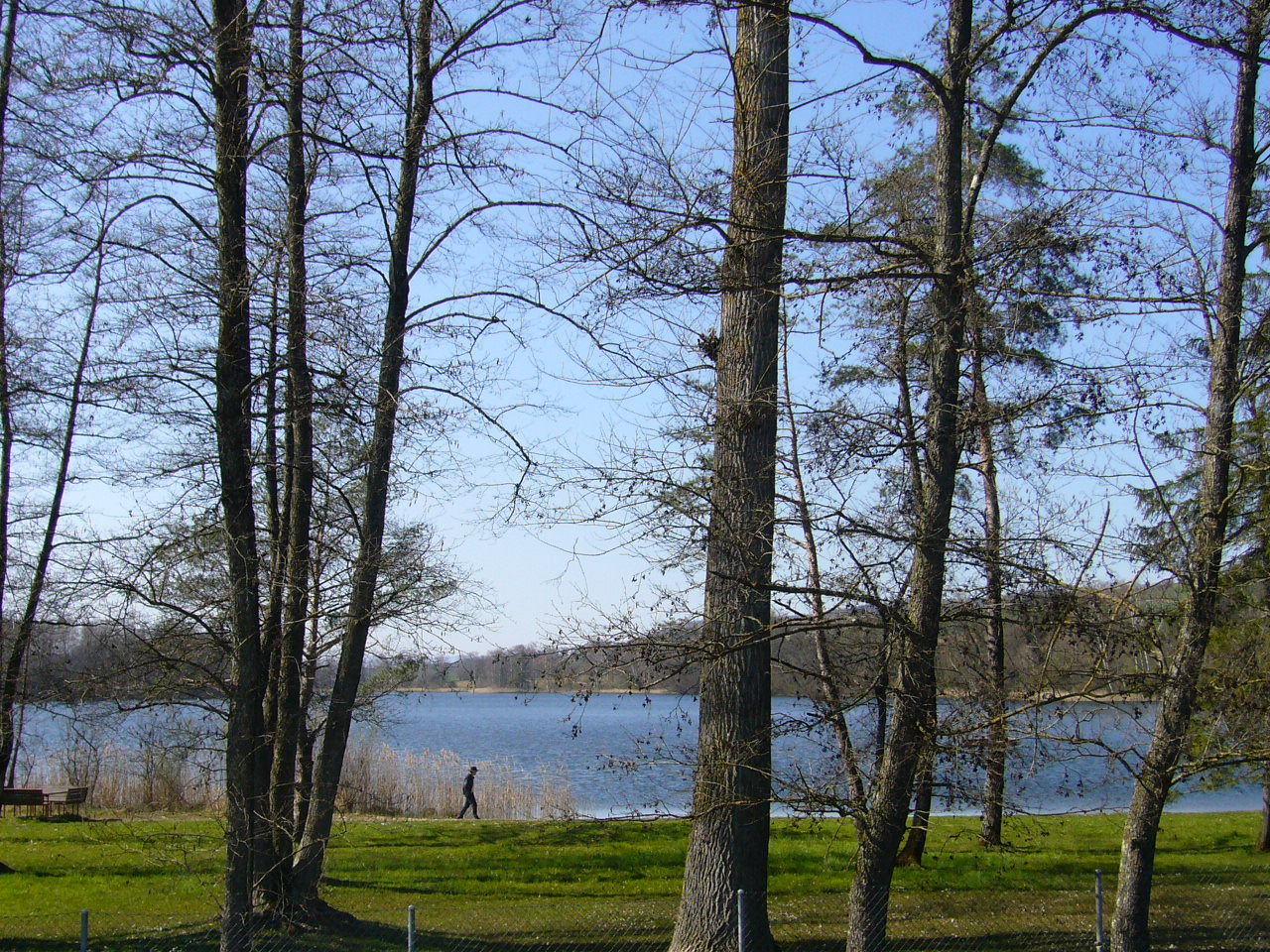

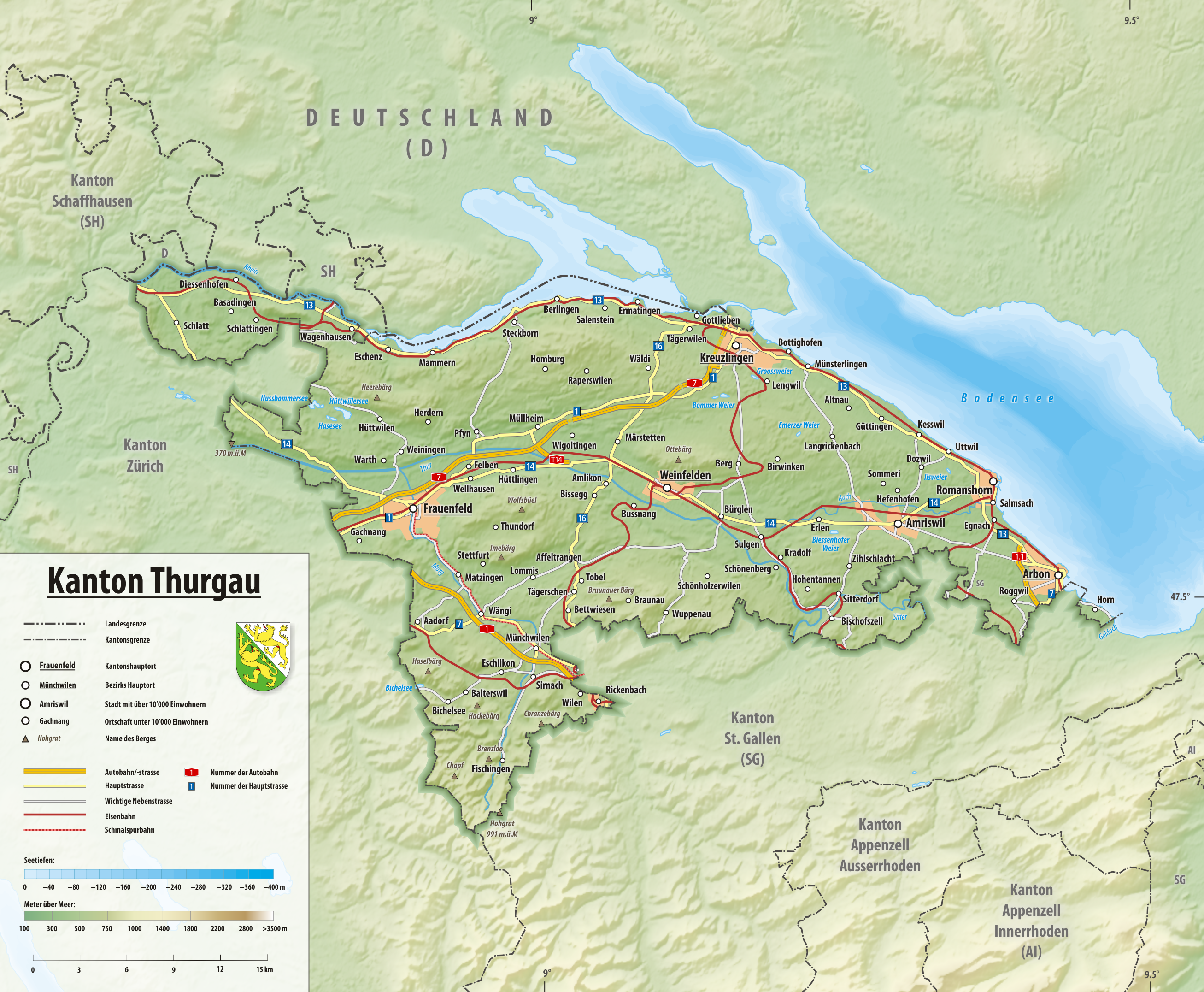
- Location within Canton of Thurgau Location within Switzerland Location within Alps
- Interactive map of Hüttwilersee
- Location: Thurgau
- Coordinates: 47°36′38″N 08°50′33″E
- Primary outflows: Seebach
- Basin countries: Switzerland
- Surface area: 0.346 km^{2} (0.134 sq mi)
- Average depth: 7.7 m (25 ft)
- Max. depth: 14.8 m (49 ft)
- Water volume: 2,680,000 m^{3} (2,170 acre⋅ft)
- Surface elevation: 433.56 m (1,422.4 ft)

Hüttwilersee is a lake in the Canton of Thurgau, Switzerland. It is located near two other lakes, Nussbaumersee and Hasensee, on the border of the municipalities of Hüttwilen und Uesslingen-Buch.

== See also ==
- List of lakes of Switzerland
