= Hasensee =

Lake in Switzerland

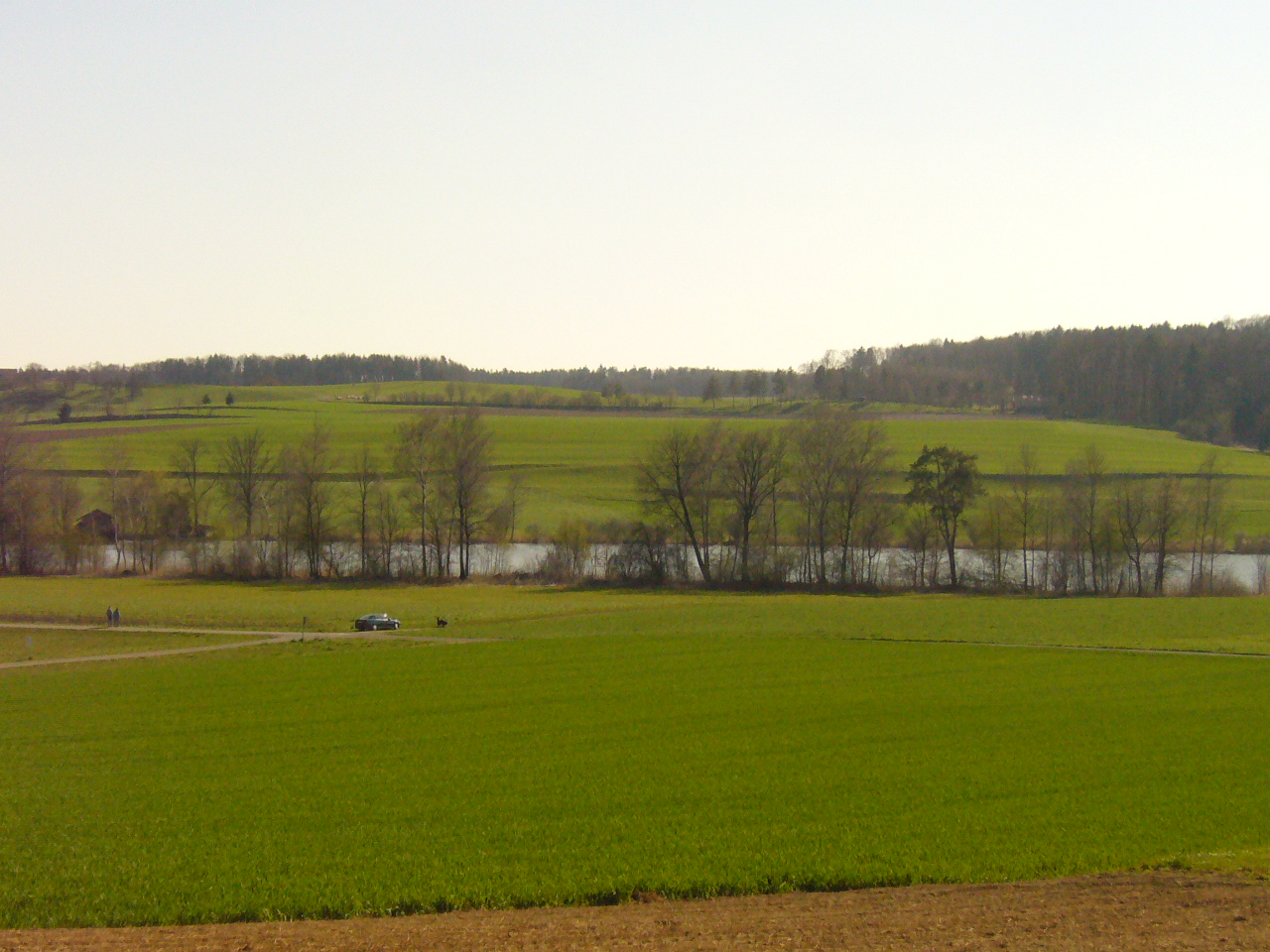

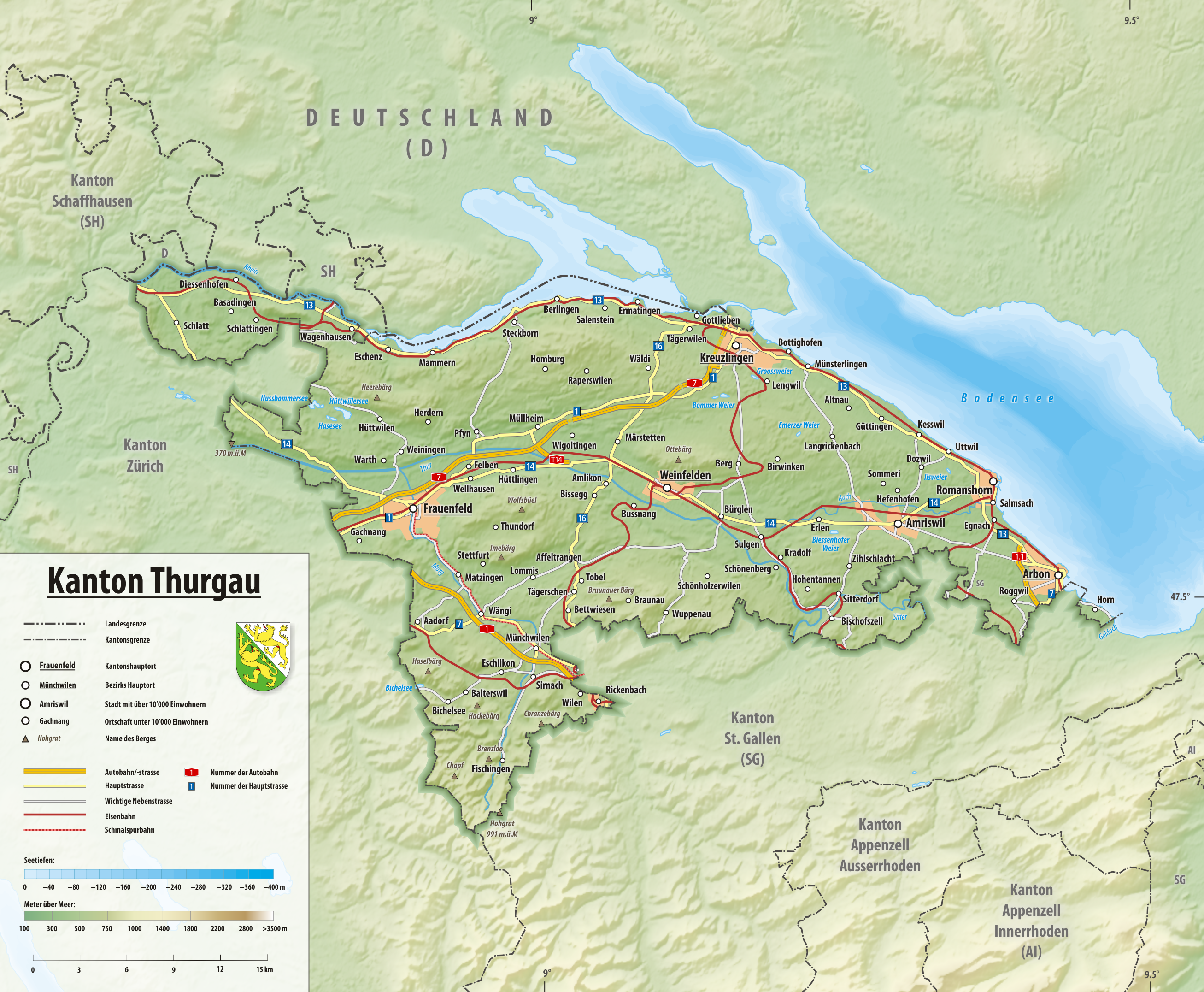
- Location within Canton of Thurgau Location within Switzerland Location within Alps
- Interactive map of Hasensee
- Location: Thurgau
- Coordinates: 47°36′28″N 08°49′48″E
- Primary outflows: Seebach
- Basin countries: Switzerland
- Surface area: 0.111 km^{2} (0.043 sq mi)
- Average depth: 3.9 m (13 ft)
- Max. depth: 7.3 m (24 ft)
- Water volume: 434,000 m^{3} (352 acre⋅ft)
- Surface elevation: 434.16 m (1,424.4 ft)

Hasensee is a lake in the canton of Thurgau, Switzerland. It is located in the same valley as Nussbaumersee and Hüttwilersee. Its surface area is 11.1 ha (27 acres) and the surface elevation is 434.16 m, after being lowered by 1.5 m in World War II.

Hasensee is or was also known as Buchemer See or oberer See (upper lake).
