= Mammern =

- Municipality
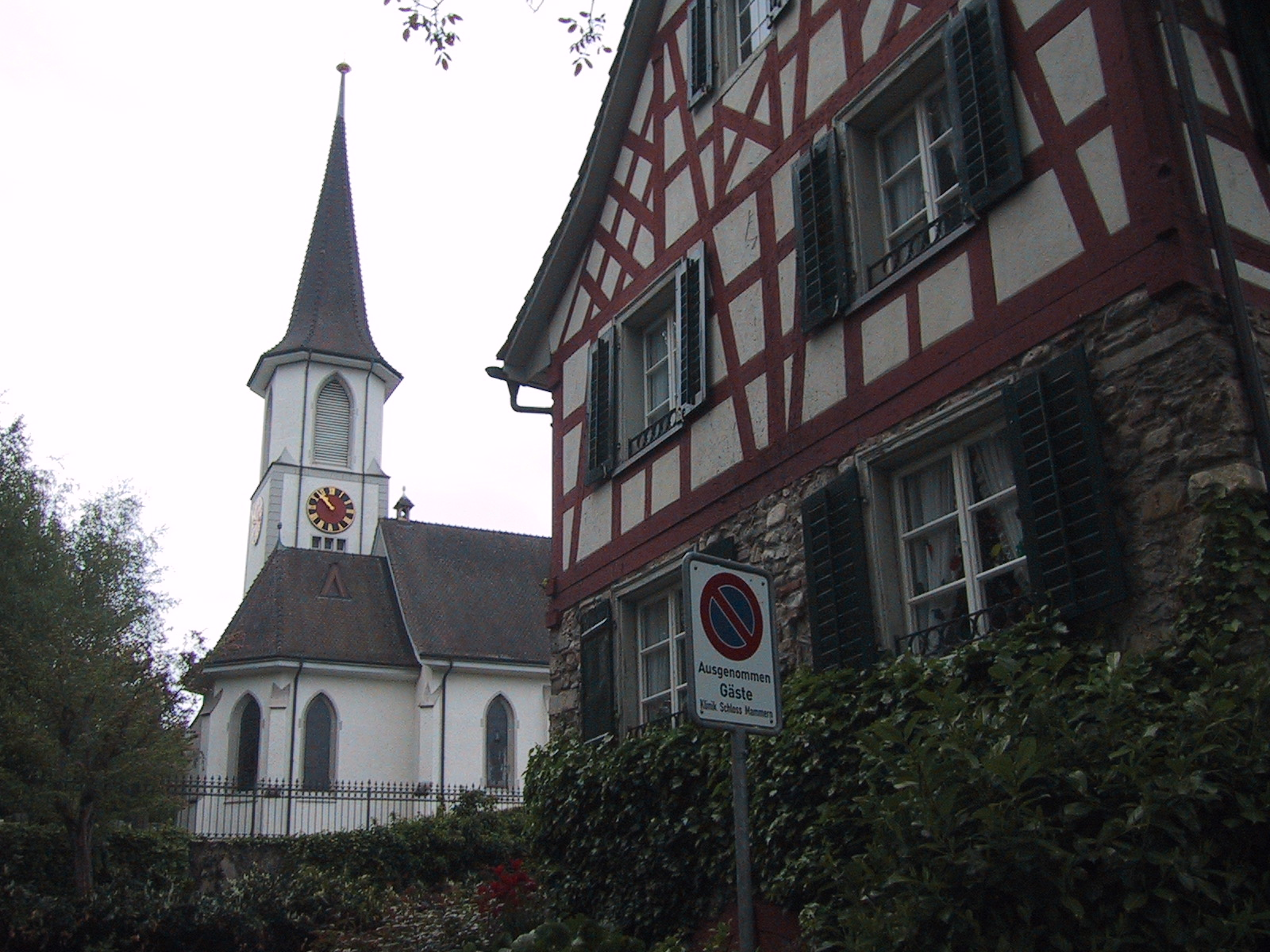

- Coat of arms
- Location of Mammern
- Location within Switzerland Location within Canton of Thurgau
- Coordinates: 47°38′N 8°54′E
- Country: Switzerland
- Canton: Thurgau
- District: Frauenfeld

Area
  - Total: 5.42 km^{2} (2.09 sq mi)
- Elevation: 400 m (1,300 ft)

Population (December 2007)
  - Total: 585
  - Density: 108/km^{2} (280/sq mi)
- Time zone: UTC+01:00 (CET)
  - Summer (DST): UTC+02:00 (CEST)
- Postal code: 8265
- SFOS number: 4826
- ISO 3166 code: CH-TG
- Surrounded by: Eschenz, Herdern, Homburg, Hüttwilen, Öhningen (DE-BW), Steckborn
- Website: www.mammern.ch

Mammern is a municipality in Frauenfeld District in the canton of Thurgau, Switzerland, on Lake Constance.

== History ==
Finds from the Neolithic Age, Bronze Age (including stilt houses and stone hatchets) and the Early Middle Ages show that there was a continuous settlement in the area. The modern village of Mammern is first mentioned in 909 as Manburron, when it was acquired by St. Gallen Abbey. They ruled over Mammern and Neuburg until the 12th century. In 1319, St. Gallen pawned both villages to the Kastell family. Then, in 1522, Hans Leonhard von Reischach bought the villages. They were sold several times in the following century, until 1621 when Johann Friedrich Thumb gave the Herrschaft to the von Roll brothers who rebuilt the castle. In 1667 the Herrschaft was acquired by Wolf Rudolf Reding, who sold it in 1687 to Rheinau Abbey. Rheinau held the land rights to the village until 1798. From 1803 until 1992 the Ortsgemeinde of Mammern was part of the municipality of Steckborn.

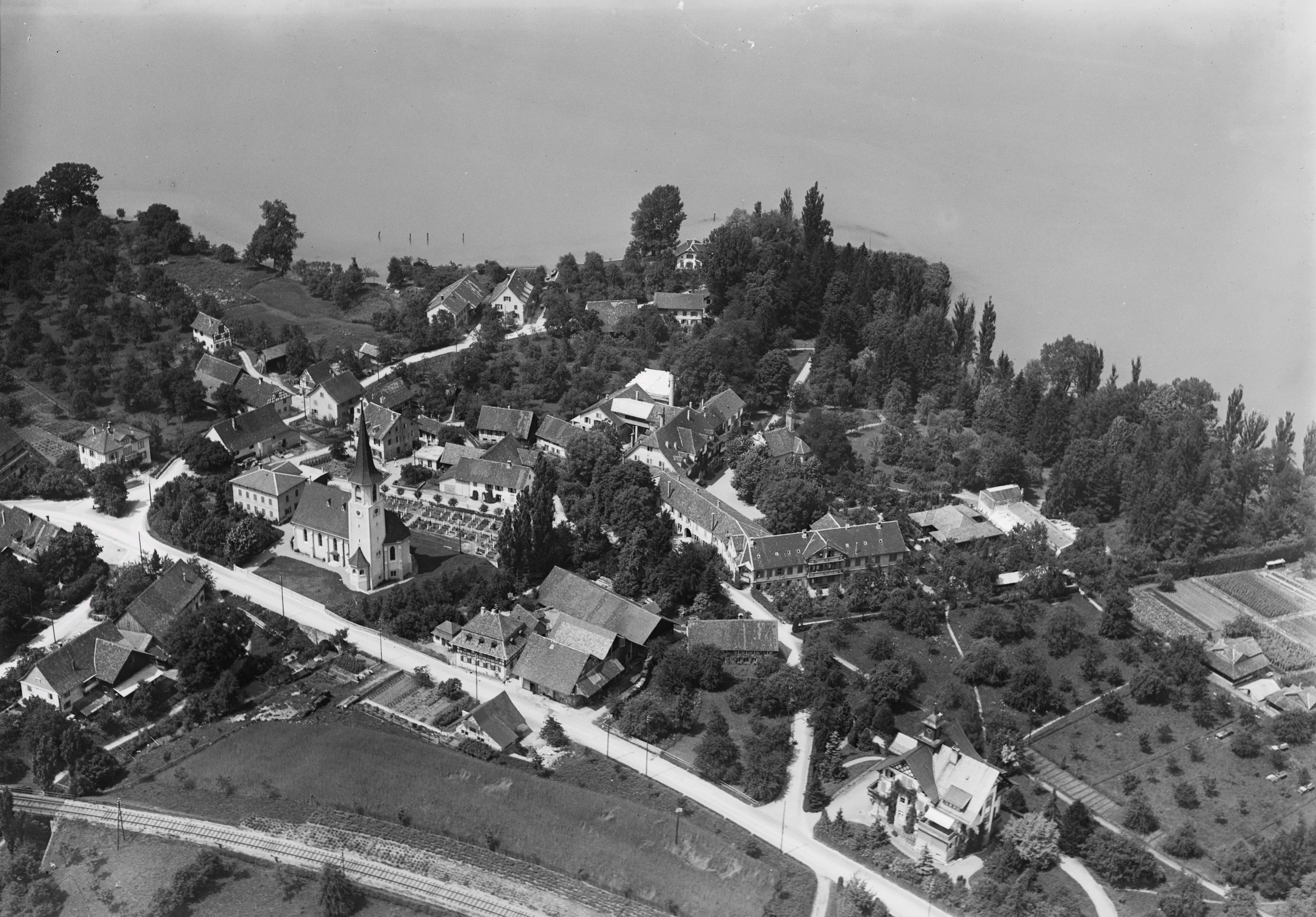
Aerial view from 100 m by Walter Mittelholzer (1919)

At sometime before 1275 St. Gallen Abbey, built the village a church. The rights to collect church taxes and appoint priests remained with the abbey until 1838 when those rights went to Canton of Thurgau. In 1843 that right went to the parish. The Protestant Reformation was introduced into the village in 1529. St. Gallen Abbey supported the Counter-Reformation through the investiture of Catholic judges. In 1749 the abbot of Rheinau Abbey, Bernhard Rusconi, built a baroque chapel near the castle. After the fire of 1909 destroyed the Simultankirche, in 1911 the Reformed church was dedicated followed by the Catholic Church in 1913.

The economy of Mammern was characterized by forestry, farming and viticulture, as well as the livestock and dairy farming. Other occupations included fishing, taverns, mills, a brick hut and a lime kiln. From 1878 until 1940 there was a furniture veneer factory. In 1910 a match factory opened in the village. In 1865 a hydropathic clinic was opened in the castle. In 1889 the building was acquired by Oscar M. Ullmann. The clinic specialized in the rehabilitation of patients with cardiovascular and metabolic diseases.

== Geography ==
Mammern has an area, as of 2009, of 5.42 square kilometers (2.09 sq mi). Of this area, 2.44 km^{2} (0.94 sq mi) or 45.0% is used for agricultural purposes, while 2.33 km^{2} (0.90 sq mi) or 43.0% is forested. Of the rest of the land, 0.64 km^{2} (0.25 sq mi) or 11.8% is settled (buildings or roads), 0.01 km^{2} (2.5 acres) or 0.2% is either rivers or lakes and 0.01 km^{2} (2.5 acres) or 0.2% is unproductive land.

Of the built up area, industrial buildings made up 6.3% of the total area while housing and buildings made up 0.0% and transportation infrastructure made up 0.2%. while parks, green belts and sports fields made up 4.4%. Out of the forested land, 41.3% of the total land area is heavily forested and 1.7% is covered with orchards or small clusters of trees. Of the agricultural land, 35.1% is used for growing crops, while 10.0% is used for orchards or vine crops. All the water in the municipality is flowing water.

The municipality is located in Frauenfeld District, on the Untersee of Lake Constance 4 km (2.5 mi) east of Stein am Rhein. It consists of the village of Mammern and the hamlets of Klingenzell and Neuburg.

== Demographics ==
Mammern has a population (as of December 2020) of 677 As of 2008, 22.9% of the population are foreign nationals. Over the last 10 years (1997–2007) the population has changed at a rate of 5.3%. Most of the population (as of 2000) speaks German(87.1%), with Portuguese being second most common (3.9%) and Albanian being third (2.1%).

As of 2008, the gender distribution of the population was 51.9% male and 48.1% female. The population was made up of 226 Swiss men (39.0% of the population), and 75 (12.9%) non-Swiss men. There were 221 Swiss women (38.1%), and 58 (10.0%) non-Swiss women. In 2008 there were 9 live births to Swiss citizens and 1 birth to a non-Swiss citizen, and in same time span there were 8 deaths of Swiss citizens and 1 non-Swiss citizen death. Ignoring immigration and emigration, the population of Swiss citizens increased by 1 while the foreign population remained the same. There were 3 Swiss men who emigrated from Switzerland to another country, 2 Swiss women who emigrated from Switzerland to another country, 7 non-Swiss men who emigrated from Switzerland to another country and 1 non-Swiss woman who emigrated from Switzerland to another country. The total Swiss population change in 2008 (from all sources) was an increase of 4 and the non-Swiss population remained the same. This represents a population growth rate of 0.7%.

The age distribution, as of 2009, in Mammern is; 64 children or 11.0% of the population are between 0 and 9 years old and 79 teenagers or 13.5% are between 10 and 19. Of the adult population, 67 people or 11.5% of the population are between 20 and 29 years old. 69 people or 11.8% are between 30 and 39, 115 people or 19.7% are between 40 and 49, and 77 people or 13.2% are between 50 and 59. The senior population distribution is 52 people or 8.9% of the population are between 60 and 69 years old, 43 people or 7.4% are between 70 and 79, there are 18 people or 3.1% who are between 80 and 89.

As of 2000, there were 231 private households in the municipality, and an average of 2.3 persons per household. In 2000 there were 114 single family homes (or 78.1% of the total) out of a total of 146 inhabited buildings. There were 17 two family buildings (11.6%), 5 three family buildings (3.4%) and 10 multi-family buildings (or 6.8%). There were 113 (or 21.2%) persons who were part of a couple without children, and 288 (or 54.0%) who were part of a couple with children. There were 16 (or 3.0%) people who lived in single parent home, while there are 2 persons who were adult children living with one or both parents, 6 persons who lived in a household made up of relatives, 4 who lived in a household made up of unrelated persons, and 13 who are either institutionalized or live in another type of collective housing. The vacancy rate for the municipality, in 2008, was 2.1%. As of 2007, the construction rate of new housing units was 1.7 new units per 1000 residents.

In 2000 there were 315 apartments in the municipality. The most common apartment size was the 5 room apartment of which there were 61. There were 27 single room apartments and 51 apartments with six or more rooms. As of 2000 the average price to rent an average apartment in Mammern was 1023.87 Swiss francs (CHF) per month (US$820, £460, €660 approx. exchange rate from 2000). The average rate for a one-room apartment was 533.50 CHF (US$430, £240, €340), a two-room apartment was about 849.66 CHF (US$680, £380, €540), a three-room apartment was about 1104.88 CHF (US$880, £500, €710) and a six or more room apartment cost an average of 2250.00 CHF (US$1800, £1010, €1440). The average apartment price in Mammern was 91.7% of the national average of 1116 CHF.

In the 2007 federal election the most popular party was the SVP which received 45.93% of the vote. The next three most popular parties were the FDP (19.42%), the CVP (14.87%) and the Green Party (9.01%). In the federal election, a total of 197 votes were cast, and the voter turnout was 57.8%.

The historical population is given in the following table:

year	population
1850	322
1860	312
1870	280
1880	326
1890	364
1900	398
1950	401
1960	424
1980	392
1990	484
2000	533

== Heritage sites of national significance ==
The castle with park and chapel and the pilgrimage church of Mariahilf in Klingenzell are listed as Swiss heritage sites of national significance.

The village of Mammern and the Eschenzer Basin (including Eschenz and Mammern) is designated as part of the Inventory of Swiss Heritage Sites.

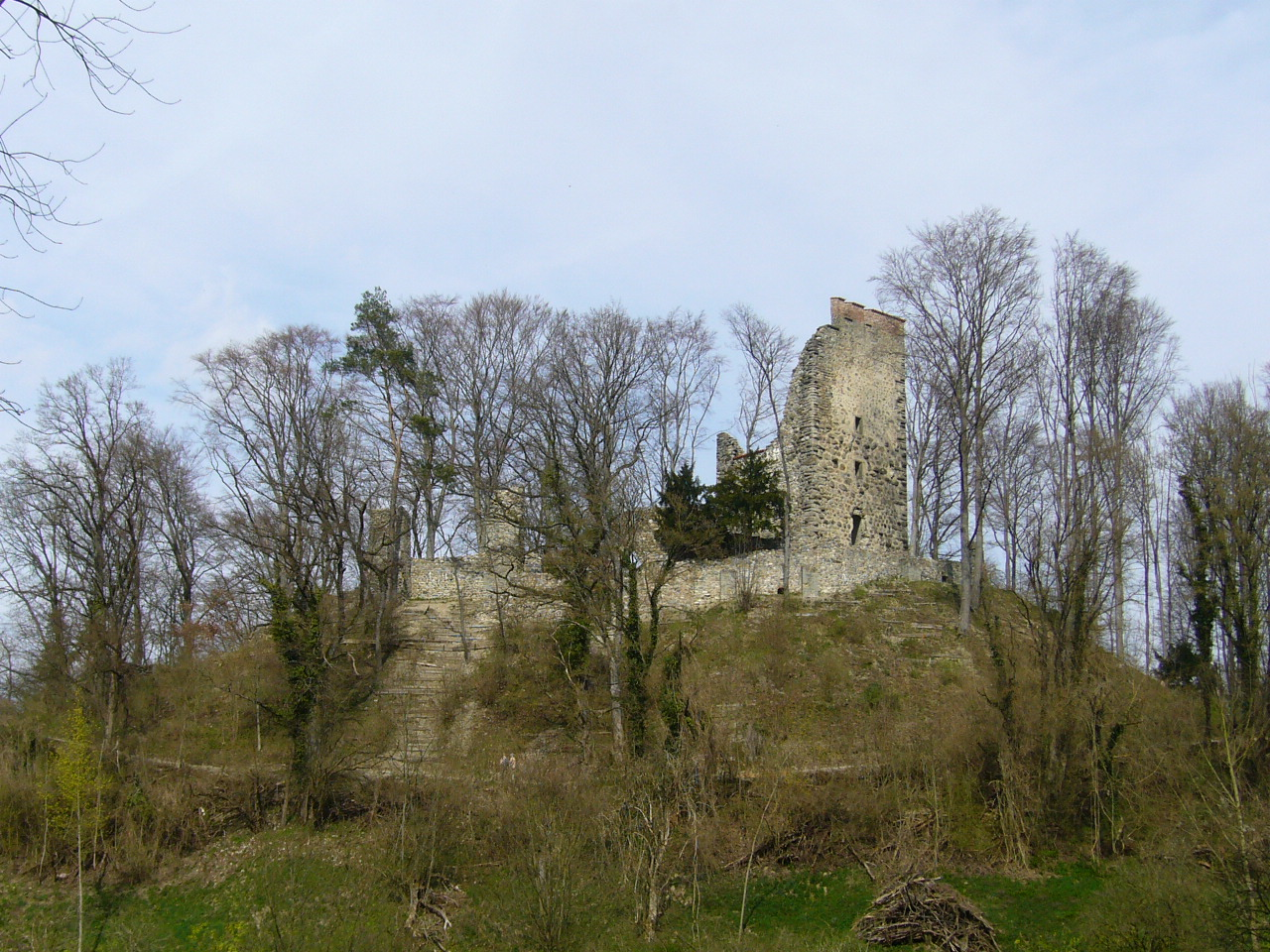
Ruins of Mammern Neuburg Castle

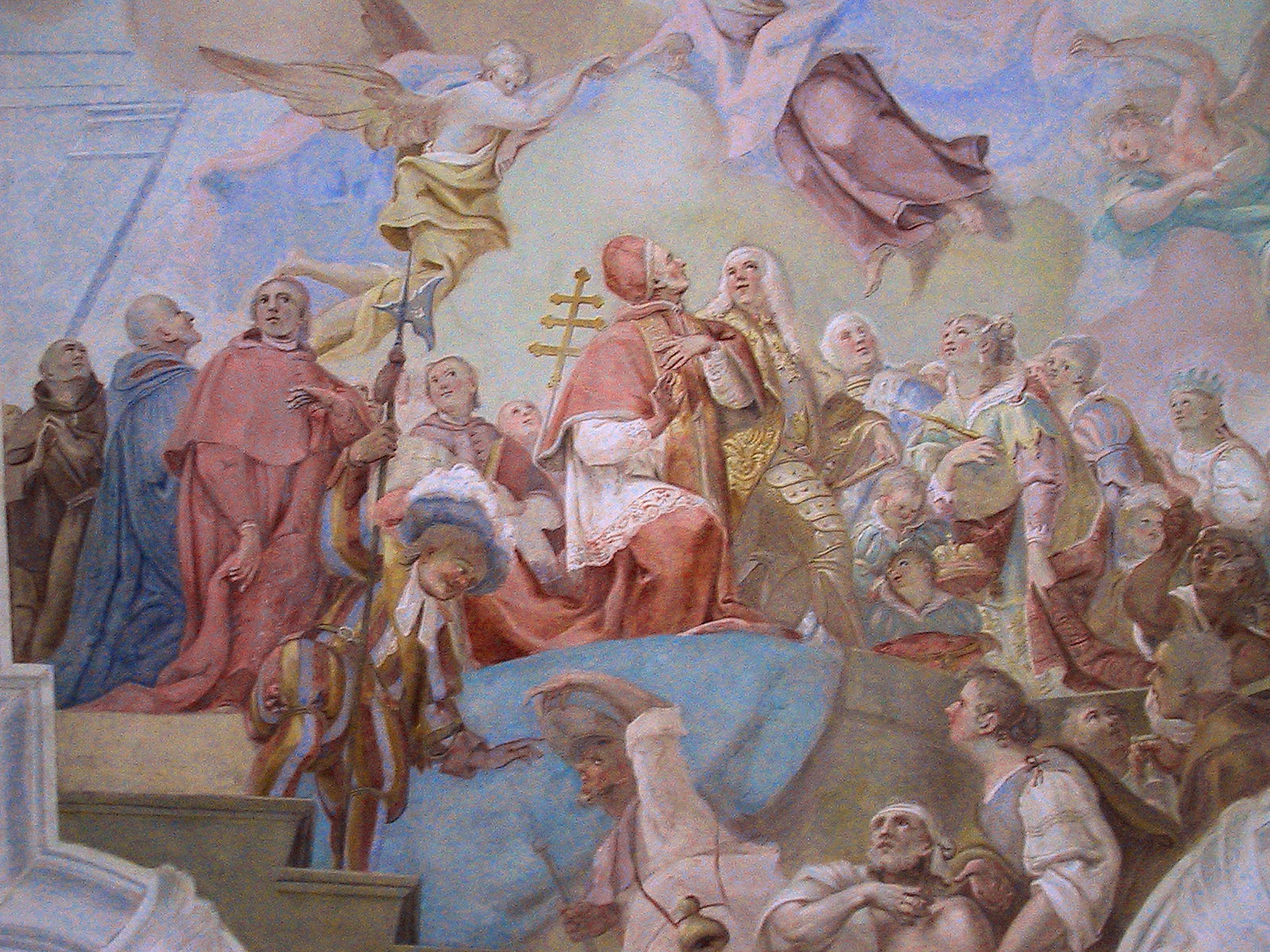
Painting from the castle church

== Economy ==
As of 2007, Mammern had an unemployment rate of 1.13%. As of 2005, there were 41 people employed in the primary economic sector and about 13 businesses involved in this sector. 7 people are employed in the secondary sector and there are 4 businesses in this sector. 325 people are employed in the tertiary sector, with 30 businesses in this sector.

In 2000 there were 388 workers who lived in the municipality. Of these, 148 or about 38.1% of the residents worked outside Mammern while 188 people commuted into the municipality for work. There were a total of 428 jobs (of at least 6 hours per week) in the municipality. Of the working population, 8.1% used public transportation to get to work, and 43.5% used a private car.

== Religion ==
From the 2000 census, 195 or 36.6% were Roman Catholic, while 232 or 43.5% belonged to the Swiss Reformed Church. Of the rest of the population, there are 12 individuals (or about 2.25% of the population) who belong to the Orthodox Church, and there are 8 individuals (or about 1.50% of the population) who belong to another Christian church. There were 16 (or about 3.00% of the population) who are Islamic. There are 8 individuals (or about 1.50% of the population) who belong to another church (not listed on the census), 51 (or about 9.57% of the population) belong to no church, are agnostic or atheist, and 11 individuals (or about 2.06% of the population) did not answer the question.

== Transport ==
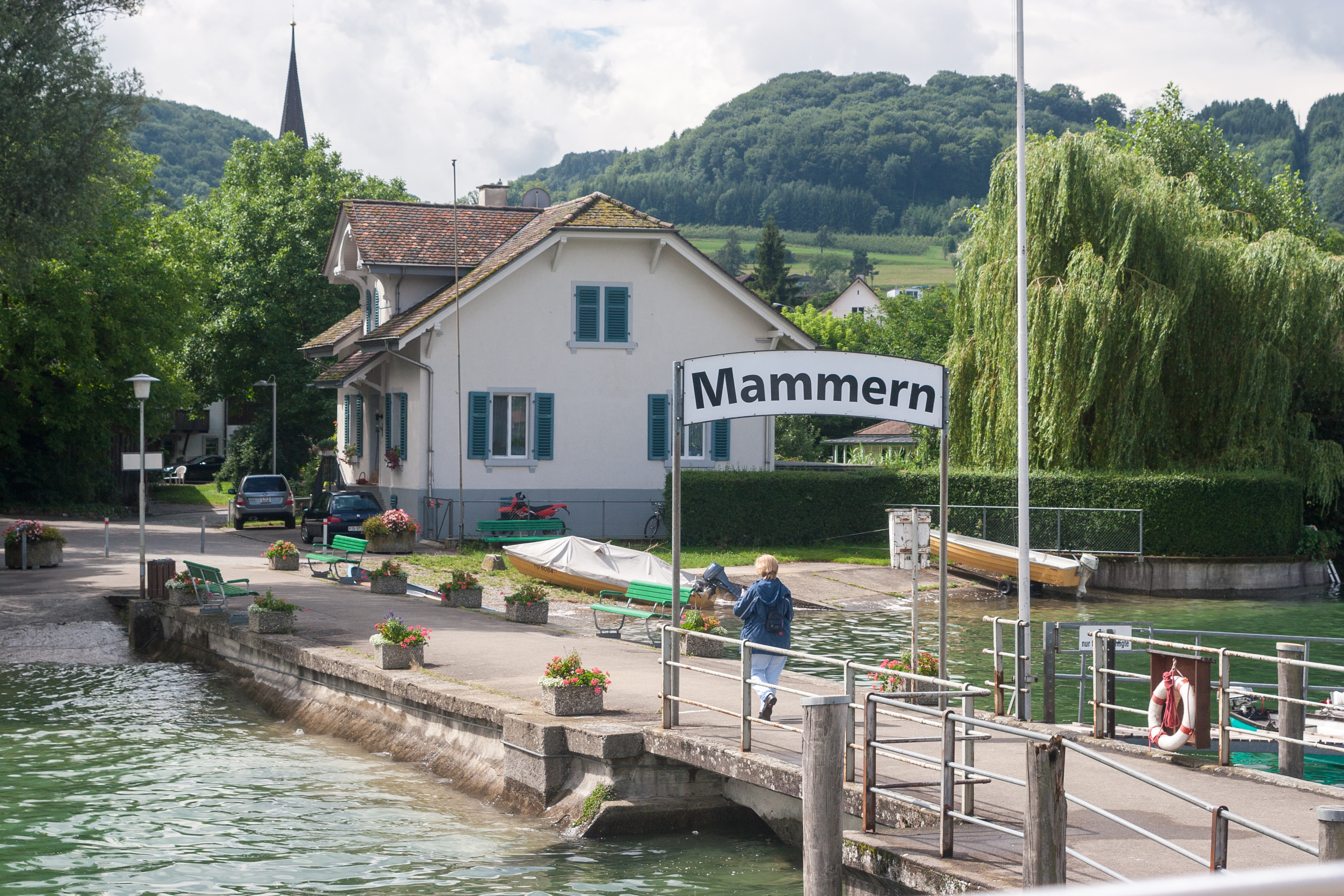
Mammern landing stage

Mammern sits on the Lake Line between Schaffhausen and Rorschach and is served by the St. Gallen S-Bahn at Mammern railway station.

Mammern has a landing stage. Between spring and autumn, the URh offers regular boat services on the High Rhine and Untersee between Schaffhausen and Kreuzlingen, via Konstanz.

== Education ==
The entire Swiss population is generally well educated. In Mammern about 74.1% of the population (between age 25 and 64) have completed either non-mandatory upper secondary education or additional higher education (either university or a Fachhochschule).

Mammern is home to the Mammern combined municipal and primary school district. In the primary school district there are 53 students who are in kindergarten or the primary level. There are 12 children in the kindergarten, and the average class size is 12 kindergartners. Of the children in kindergarten, 2 or 16.7% are female, 6 or 50.0% are not Swiss citizens and 4 or 33.3% do not speak German natively. The lower and upper primary levels begin at about age 5-6 and last for 6 years. There are 21 children who are in the lower primary level and 20 children in the upper primary level. The average class size in the primary school is 13.67 students. At the lower primary level, there are 8 children or 38.1% of the total population who are female, 9 or 42.9% are not Swiss citizens and 8 or 38.1% do not speak German natively. In the upper primary level, there are 8 or 40.0% who are female, 1 or 5.0% are not Swiss citizens and 4 or 20.0% do not speak German natively.
