= Eschenz =

- Municipality
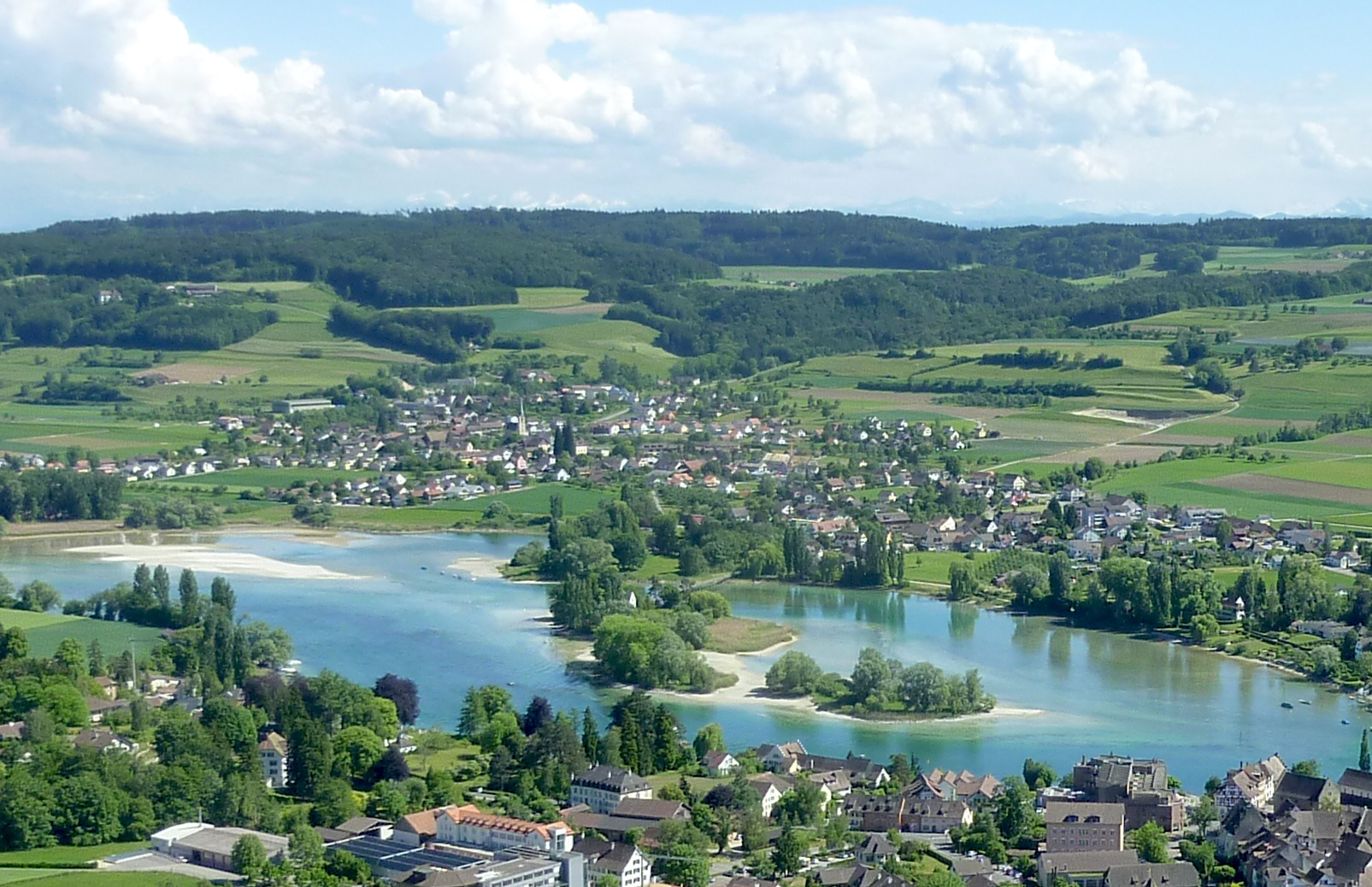

- Coat of arms
- Location of Eschenz
- Location within Switzerland Location within Canton of Thurgau
- Coordinates: 47°39′N 8°52′E
- Country: Switzerland
- Canton: Thurgau
- District: Frauenfeld

Area
  - Total: 12.0 km^{2} (4.6 sq mi)
- Elevation: 412 m (1,352 ft)

Population (December 2007)
  - Total: 1,619
  - Density: 135/km^{2} (349/sq mi)
- Time zone: UTC+01:00 (CET)
  - Summer (DST): UTC+02:00 (CEST)
- Postal code: 8264
- SFOS number: 4806
- ISO 3166 code: CH-TG
- Surrounded by: Hüttwilen, Mammern, Öhningen (DE-BW), Stein am Rhein (SH), Wagenhausen
- Website: www.eschenz.ch

Eschenz is a municipality in Frauenfeld District in the canton of Thurgau in Switzerland.

== History ==
The prehistoric shore village on Werd Island and in the Seeäckern area (northeast of Eschenz) are rich archeological sites that have contributed substantially to our understanding of the history of settlements in the narrow area around Lake Constance. The two sites remained settled throughout the prehistoric epoch and into the early historical era. In 1858, the settlement site was discovered on the main island. The excavation in 1882-83 by Schenk was followed by a second expedition in 1931–36 by Karl Keller Tarnuzzer. There was a smaller excavation in 1962 around the St. Otmars Chapel.

The first settlement of the island was made shortly after BC 4000th (Early Pfyn culture) and was part of a migration into subalpine wetlands during the beginning of the late Neolithic era. A second settlement phase (late Pfyn culture) began after long break during the middle of the 4th millennium. This was followed by a third phase of settlement (Horgen culture, 2nd half of 4th millennium). After this phase, an increase in the lake level put the entire island under water during the first half of the 3rd millennium. The next settlement wasn't until the mid-Late Bronze Age (11th century BC). The lake waters rose again, interrupting the island settlements until the final phase of the Late Bronze Age (9th century BC). During this time, parts of a number of horse bridles were discovered, indicating that the island may have been a transportation hub due to its convenient location.

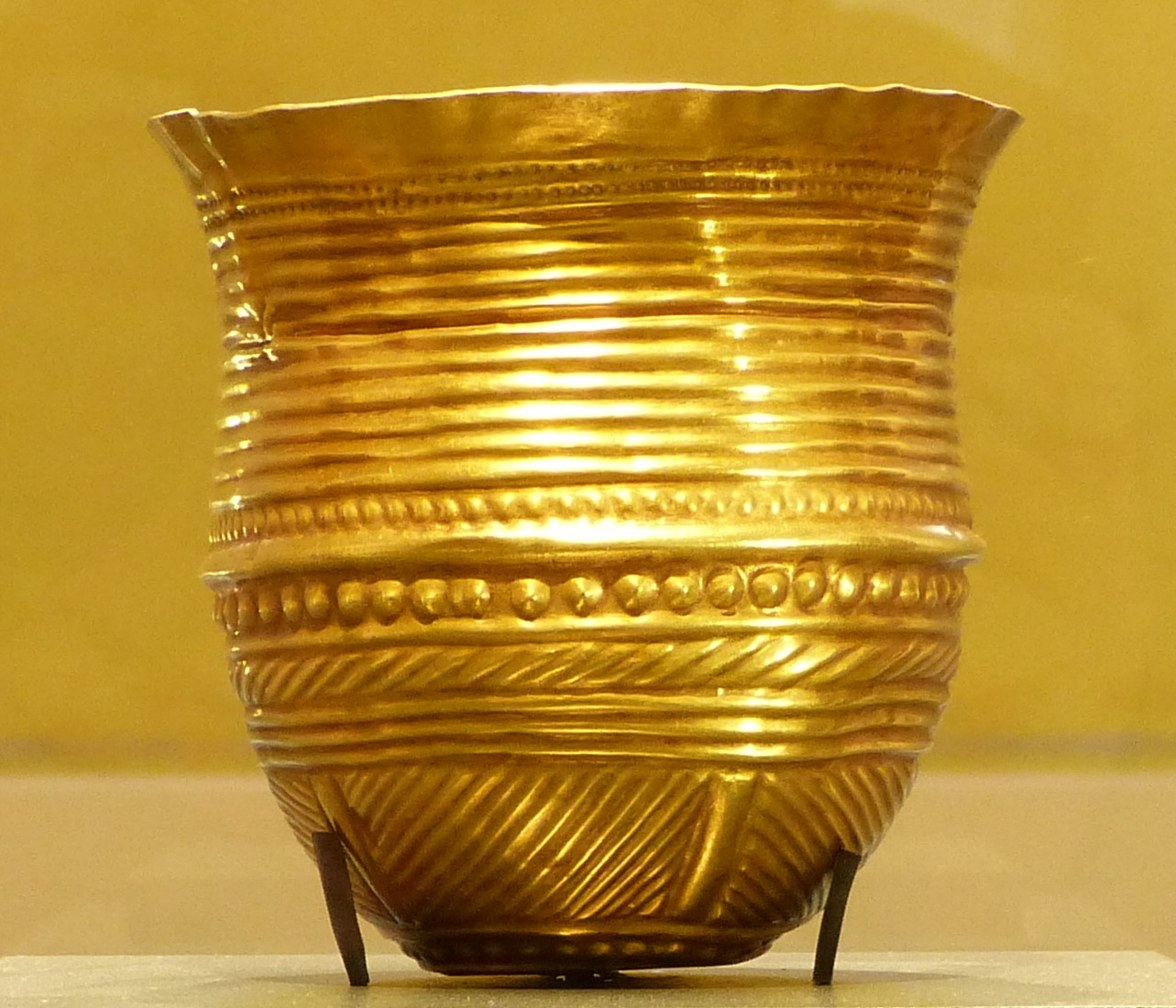
The Bronze Age golden cup from Eschenz

A gold cup dating from the early Bronze Age, 2400–1600 BC, was found in Eschenz in 1916.

The Roman era Vicus of Tasgetium which developed south of the Rhine Bridge, probably in the 2nd and 3rd Centuries, had its nucleus in Untereschenz. The settlement grew into the Kastell auf Burg in Stein am Rhein, which, together with fortifications in Pfyn (Ad Fines) and Arbon (Arbor Felix) provided the Roman border defenses around Lake Constance.

The modern village of Eschenz is first mentioned in 799 as castrum Exsientiae. In 875/76 it was mentioned as Aschinza. In 958 Eschenz came to the monastery of Einsiedeln. From 1623 until 1798 the governor of the monastery of Einsiedeln held the low court at Castle Freudenfels in Eschenz.

Aerial view (1959)

The parish of Eschenz was incorporated in 1362 under Einsiedeln. During the Reformation (1525–1529) the municipality converted to the new faith. In the course of the 1560s Counter-Reformation entered the village and converted the villagers back to the Roman Catholic faith. A Protestant minority population remained and they became part of the parish of Burg. The cemetery was used equally by both faiths until 1690.

In 1851 the village of Hüttwilen separated from Eschenz to form an independent municipality. was located beyond the lake crest Munizipalgem. from Munizipalgem. E. separated. In 1835, a paper mill opened in Eschenz. Around the end of the 19th century, animal husbandry and agriculture replaced viticulture and fishing as the major industries. With the exception of Unipektin AG, which operates in the food industry, there is no industry in Eschenz.

== Geography ==
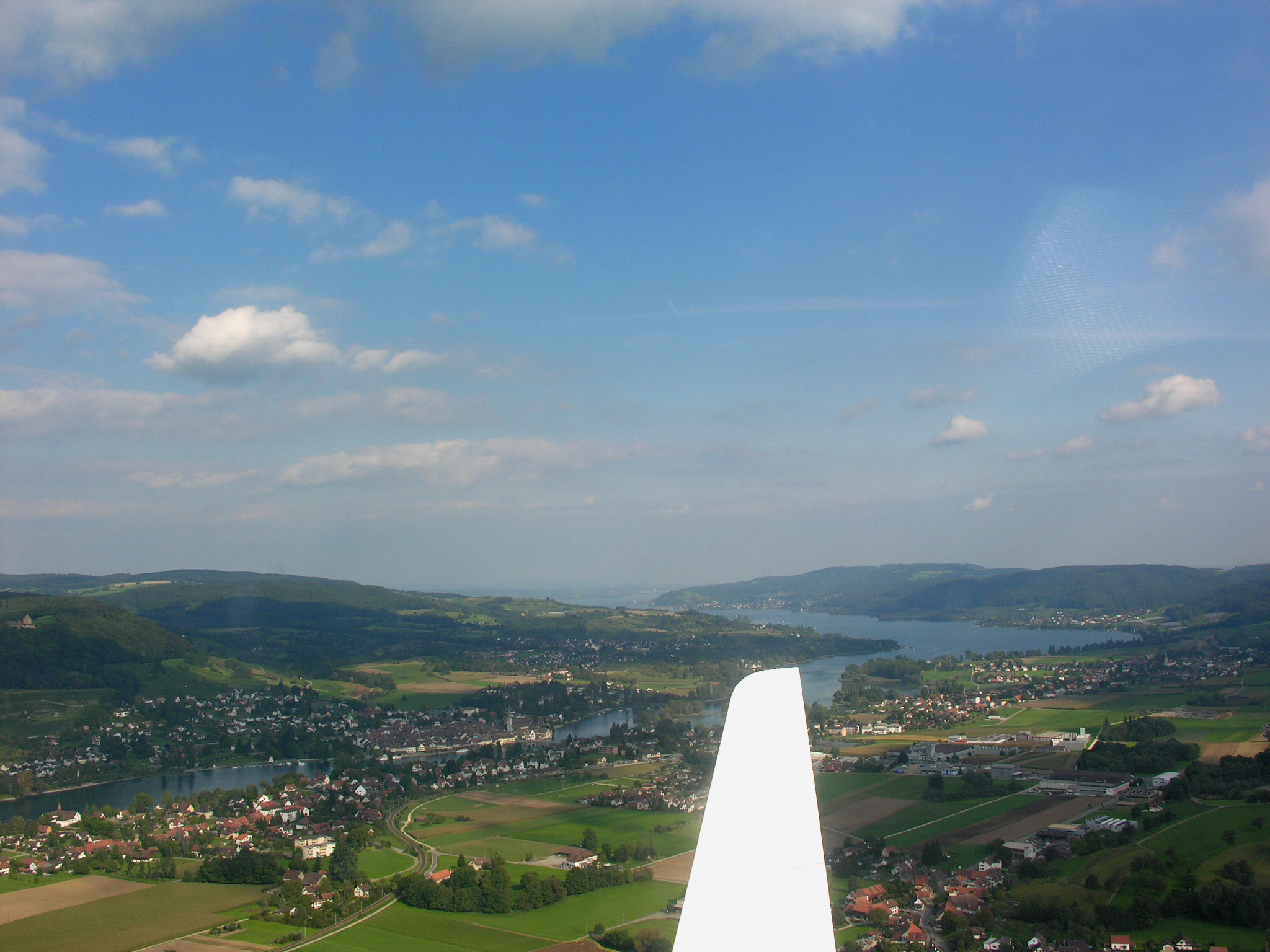
Aerial view of Wagenhausen, Stein am Rhein and Eschenz

Eschenz has an area, as of 2009, of 12.01 square kilometers (4.64 sq mi). Of this area, 6.3 km^{2} (2.4 sq mi) or 52.5% is used for agricultural purposes, while 4.38 km^{2} (1.69 sq mi) or 36.5% is forested. Of the rest of the land, 1.23 km^{2} (0.47 sq mi) or 10.2% is settled (buildings or roads) and 0.1 km^{2} (25 acres) or 0.8% is unproductive land.

Of the built up area, industrial buildings made up 5.0% of the total area while housing and buildings made up 0.5% and transportation infrastructure made up 0.4%. while parks, green belts and sports fields made up 3.7%. Out of the forested land, 34.1% of the total land area is heavily forested and 2.4% is covered with orchards or small clusters of trees. Of the agricultural land, 49.4% is used for growing crops, while 3.1% is used for orchards or vine crops.

The municipality is located in Frauenfeld District, near the outflow of the Untersee portion of Lake Constance into the Rhine river. Today it has grown toward Stein am Rhein's village section of Burg. It consists of the village of Eschenz and includes Freudenfels Castle (since 1812) and Insel Werd (Werd Island).

== Demographics ==
Eschenz has a population (as of December 2020) of 1,868 As of 2008, 14.3% of the population are foreign nationals. Over the last 10 years (1997–2007) the population has changed at a rate of 6.9%. Most of the population (as of 2000) speaks German(93.7%), with Albanian being second most common ( 2.3%) and Serbo-Croatian being third ( 1.3%).

As of 2008, the gender distribution of the population was 49.4% male and 50.6% female. The population was made up of 680 Swiss men (41.7% of the population), and 127 (7.8%) non-Swiss men. There were 719 Swiss women (44.1%), and 106 (6.5%) non-Swiss women. In 2008 there were 18 live births to Swiss citizens and 1 birth to non-Swiss citizens, and in same time span there were 14 deaths of Swiss citizens and 1 non-Swiss citizen death. Ignoring immigration and emigration, the population of Swiss citizens increased by 4 while the foreign population remained the same. There were 4 Swiss men who emigrated from Switzerland to another country, 2 Swiss women who emigrated from Switzerland to another country, 12 non-Swiss men who emigrated from Switzerland to another country and 11 non-Swiss women who emigrated from Switzerland to another country. The total Swiss population change in 2008 (from all sources) was a decrease of 2 and the non-Swiss population change was an increase of 15 people. This represents a population growth rate of 0.8%.

The age distribution, as of 2009, in Eschenz is; 154 children or 9.3% of the population are between 0 and 9 years old and 210 teenagers or 12.7% are between 10 and 19. Of the adult population, 195 people or 11.8% of the population are between 20 and 29 years old. 198 people or 12.0% are between 30 and 39, 291 people or 17.6% are between 40 and 49, and 235 people or 14.2% are between 50 and 59. The senior population distribution is 191 people or 11.5% of the population are between 60 and 69 years old, 118 people or 7.1% are between 70 and 79, there are 58 people or 3.5% who are between 80 and 89, and there are 5 people or 0.3% who are 90 and older.

As of 2000, there were 592 private households in the municipality, and an average of 2.5 persons per household. In 2000 there were 309 single family homes (or 82.4% of the total) out of a total of 375 inhabited buildings. There were 41 two family buildings (10.9%), 12 three family buildings (3.2%) and 13 multi-family buildings (or 3.5%). There were 318 (or 21.0%) persons who were part of a couple without children, and 874 (or 57.8%) who were part of a couple with children. There were 79 (or 5.2%) people who lived in single parent home, while there are 18 persons who were adult children living with one or both parents, 6 persons who lived in a household made up of relatives, 19 who lived in a household made up of unrelated persons, and 24 who are either institutionalized or live in another type of collective housing. The vacancy rate for the municipality, in 2008, was 2.78%. As of 2007, the construction rate of new housing units was 5.6 new units per 1000 residents.

In 2000 there were 673 apartments in the municipality. The most common apartment size was the 5 room apartment of which there were 167. There were 10 single room apartments and 125 apartments with six or more rooms. As of 2000 the average price to rent an average apartment in Eschenz was 1047.14 Swiss francs (CHF) per month (US$840, £470, €670 approx. exchange rate from 2003). The average rate for a one-room apartment was 475.00 CHF (US$380, £210, €300), a two-room apartment was about 731.52 CHF (US$590, £330, €470), a three-room apartment was about 893.39 CHF (US$710, £400, €570) and a six or more room apartment cost an average of 1607.88 CHF (US$1290, £720, €1030). The average apartment price in Eschenz was 93.8% of the national average of 1116 CHF.

In the 2007 federal election the most popular party was the SVP which received 41.34% of the vote. The next three most popular parties were the FDP (19.33%), the CVP (17.56%) and the Green Party (8.33%). In the federal election, a total of 571 votes were cast, and the voter turnout was 50.1%.

The historical population is given in the following table:

year	population
1831	2,115
1860	1,009 ^{a}
1900	929
1950	1,101
1990	1,356
2000	1,513

^a after the separation of Hüttwilen

== Heritage sites of national significance ==
Werd Island (a prehistoric lake shore settlement as well as the site of a Roman Vicus and bridge), Freudenfels Castle and the pilgrimage chapel of St. Otmar on Werd Island are listed as Swiss heritage sites of national significance. The Eschenzer Becken (The Eschenz basin which includes Eschenz and Mammern) is designated as part of the Inventory of Swiss Heritage Sites.

== Economy ==
As of 2007, Eschenz had an unemployment rate of 1.73%. As of 2005, there were 95 people employed in the primary economic sector and about 35 businesses involved in this sector. 159 people are employed in the secondary sector and there are 21 businesses in this sector. 230 people are employed in the tertiary sector, with 46 businesses in this sector.

In 2000 there were 1,048 workers who lived in the municipality. Of these, 485 or about 46.3% of the residents worked outside Eschenz while 188 people commuted into the municipality for work. There were a total of 751 jobs (of at least 6 hours per week) in the municipality. Of the working population, 13.3% used public transportation to get to work, and 43.5% used a private car.

== Transport ==
Eschenz sits on the Lake Line between Schaffhausen and Rorschach and is served by the St. Gallen S-Bahn at Eschenz railway station.

== Religion ==
From the 2000 census, 557 or 36.8% were Roman Catholic, while 663 or 43.8% belonged to the Swiss Reformed Church. Of the rest of the population, there are 23 individuals (or about 1.52% of the population) who belong to the Orthodox Church, and there are 26 individuals (or about 1.72% of the population) who belong to another Christian church. There were 92 (or about 6.08% of the population) who are Islamic. There are 3 individuals (or about 0.20% of the population) who belong to another church (not listed on the census), 108 (or about 7.14% of the population) belong to no church, are agnostic or atheist, and 41 individuals (or about 2.71% of the population) did not answer the question.

== Education ==
The entire Swiss population is generally well educated. In Eschenz about 74% of the population (between age 25-64) have completed either non-mandatory upper secondary education or additional higher education (either university or a Fachhochschule).

Eschenz is home to the Eschenz primary school district. It is also home to the Eschenz secondary school district.

In the primary school district there are 126 students who are in kindergarten or the primary level. There are 31 children in the kindergarten, and the average class size is 15.5 kindergartners. Of the children in kindergarten, 14 or 45.2% are female, 2 or 6.5% are not Swiss citizens and 3 or 9.7% do not speak German natively. The lower and upper primary levels begin at about age 5-6 and lasts for 6 years. There are 48 children in who are at the lower primary level and 47 children in the upper primary level. The average class size in the primary school is 19 students. At the lower primary level, there are 17 children or 35.4% of the total population who are female, 6 or 12.5% are not Swiss citizens and 5 or 10.4% do not speak German natively. In the upper primary level, there are 22 or 46.8% who are female, 6 or 12.8% are not Swiss citizens and 5 or 10.6% do not speak German natively.

In the secondary school district there are 122 students at the secondary level. At the secondary level, students are divided according to performance. The secondary level begins at about age 12 and usually lasts 3 years. There are 67 teenagers who are in the advanced school, of which 36 or 53.7% are female, 6 or 9.0% are not Swiss citizens and 4 or 6.0% do not speak German natively. There are 55 teenagers who are in the standard school, of which 26 or 47.3% are female, 14 or 25.5% are not Swiss citizens and 13 or 23.6% do not speak German natively. The average class size for all classes at the secondary level is 17.43 students.

== Notable people ==
- Ferdinand Bach (1888-1967) - carver of wooden duck decoys
