= Hünikon =

Hünikon may refer to

- Hünikon, Thurgau, a settlement in the municipality of Amlikon-Bissegg in the Swiss canton of Thurgau
- Hünikon, Zürich, a settlement in the municipality of Neftenbach in the Swiss canton of Zürich
