= Johann Jakob Wehrli =

Swiss educator (1790–1855)

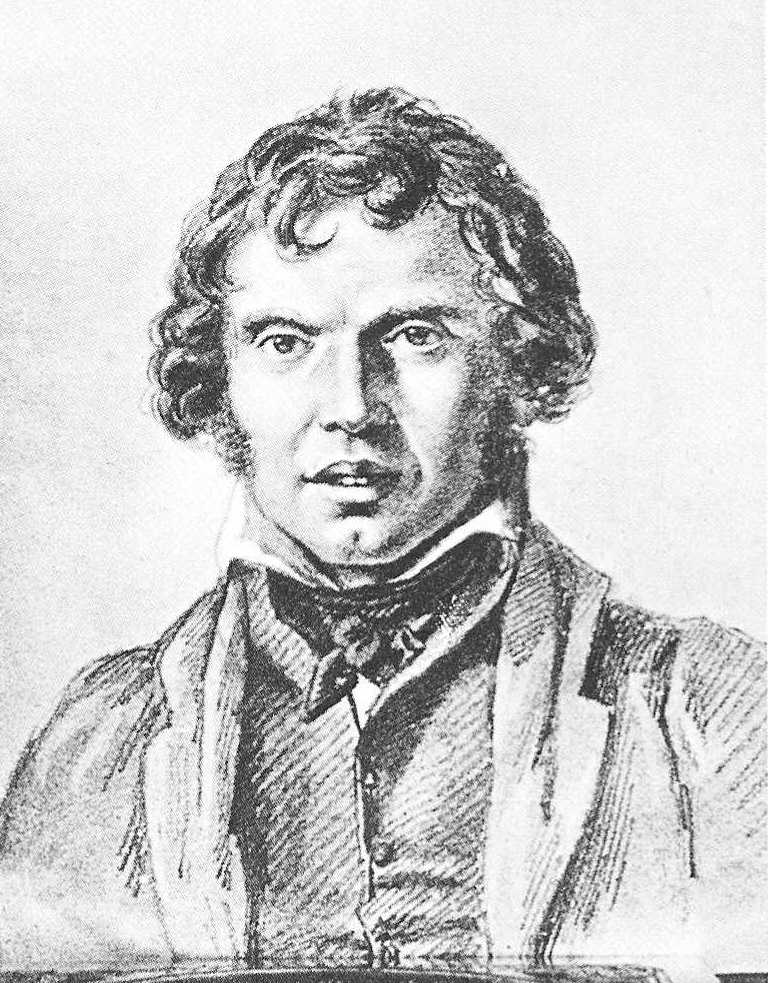
- Born: 6 November 1790; Eschikofen, Thurgau, Old Swiss Confederacy
- Died: 15 March 1855 (aged 64); Andwil, Thurgau, Switzerland
- Occupation: Educator
- Spouse: Anna Schlunegger (m. 1830)
- Parents: Thomas Wehrli (father); Anna Barbara Scher (mother)

Johann Jakob Wehrli (6 November 1790 – 15 March 1855) was a Swiss educator from the canton of Thurgau. From 1810 to 1833 he taught at the school for the poor at Philipp Emanuel von Fellenberg's institute in Hofwil, where he combined schooling with manual work; comparable experiments in Europe were from then on called "Wehrli schools". In 1833 he became the first director of the teacher training college in Kreuzlingen, and until well into the 1840s he was the recognized leading figure of the Thurgau school system.

== Biography ==
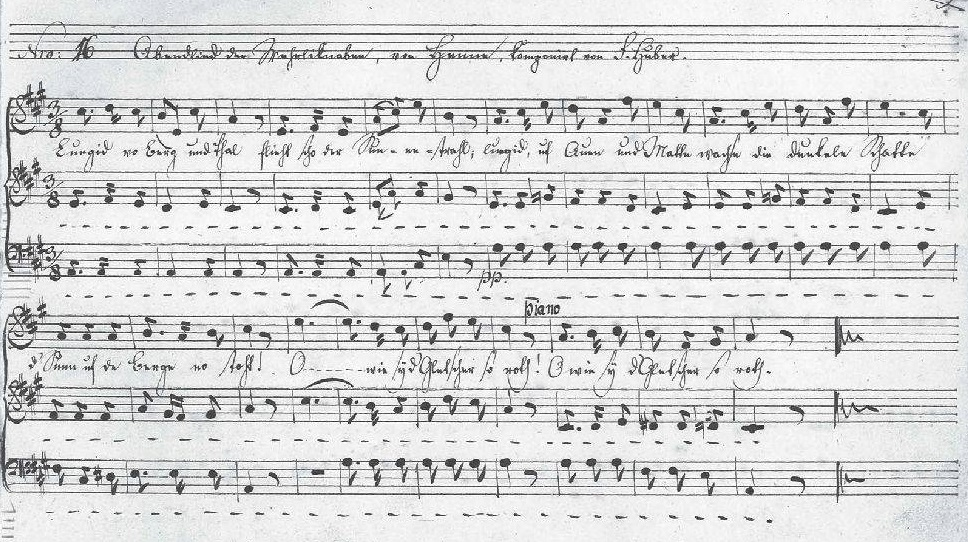
Score of the Abendlied der Wehrliknaben (Evening song of the Wehrli boys) by the composer Ferdinand Fürchtegott Huber (Kantonsbibliothek Vadiana, St. Gallen)

Johann Jakob Wehrli was born on 6 November 1790 in Eschikofen, now part of the municipality of Hüttlingen, the son of Thomas Wehrli, a schoolmaster, and Anna Barbara Scher. In 1830 he married Anna Kunz née Schlunegger, a widow, daughter of Christian Schlunegger, a teacher.

Wehrli attended the town school (Stadtschule) in Frauenfeld and, in 1807, a further training course for rural schoolteachers. In 1807–1808 and 1808–1809 he worked as an assistant teacher (Schulvikar) in Leutenegg, in the municipality of Schönholzerswilen. From 1810 to 1833 he was the teacher of the school for the poor (Armenschule) at Fellenberg's institute in Hofwil, where he combined school lessons with manual work. Following the Hofwil model, comparable experiments in Europe were from then on called "Wehrli schools" (Wehrli-Schulen).

In 1833 the Thurgau education council (Erziehungsrat) appointed Wehrli the first director of the teacher training college (Lehrerseminar) in Kreuzlingen, which offered a two-year course. In 1839 he set up an agricultural school for boys within the college, which later became independent. Until well into the 1840s Wehrli was the recognized leading figure of the Thurgau school system. In 1853 he founded a private educational institute in Guggenbühl, in the municipality of Andwil, thereby realizing an idea that Johann Heinrich Pestalozzi had already had in mind in his experiment at the Neuhof. After 1848, however, his teaching, which was based on concrete observation (Anschaulichkeit), arranged in graded stages and continually developing, and the agricultural training of future teachers were viewed skeptically by proponents of a modern, that is, less folk-oriented (volkstümlich) conception of the teaching profession.

Wehrli was a board member of the Thurgau Society for Public Utility (Thurgauische Gemeinnützige Gesellschaft), and in 1835 he was a co-founder and the president of the cantonal agricultural society (Landwirtschaftliche Gesellschaft). He died in Andwil on 15 March 1855.

== Bibliography ==
- O. Hunziker, Joh. Jakob Wehrli als Armenerzieher und Seminardirektor, 1857
- E. Weinmann, Das Seminar Kreuzlingen, 1833–1933, 1933, 11–76
- K. Guggisberg, Philipp Emanuel von Fellenberg und sein Erziehungsstaat, 2, 1953, 260–264
- H. A. Schmid, 150 Jahre Thurgauisches Lehrerseminar Kreuzlingen, 1983

=== Archives ===
- Staatsarchiv Thurgau, Frauenfeld: personal papers (Nachlass)
