= Pfyn =

Place in Thurgau, Switzerland

- Municipality
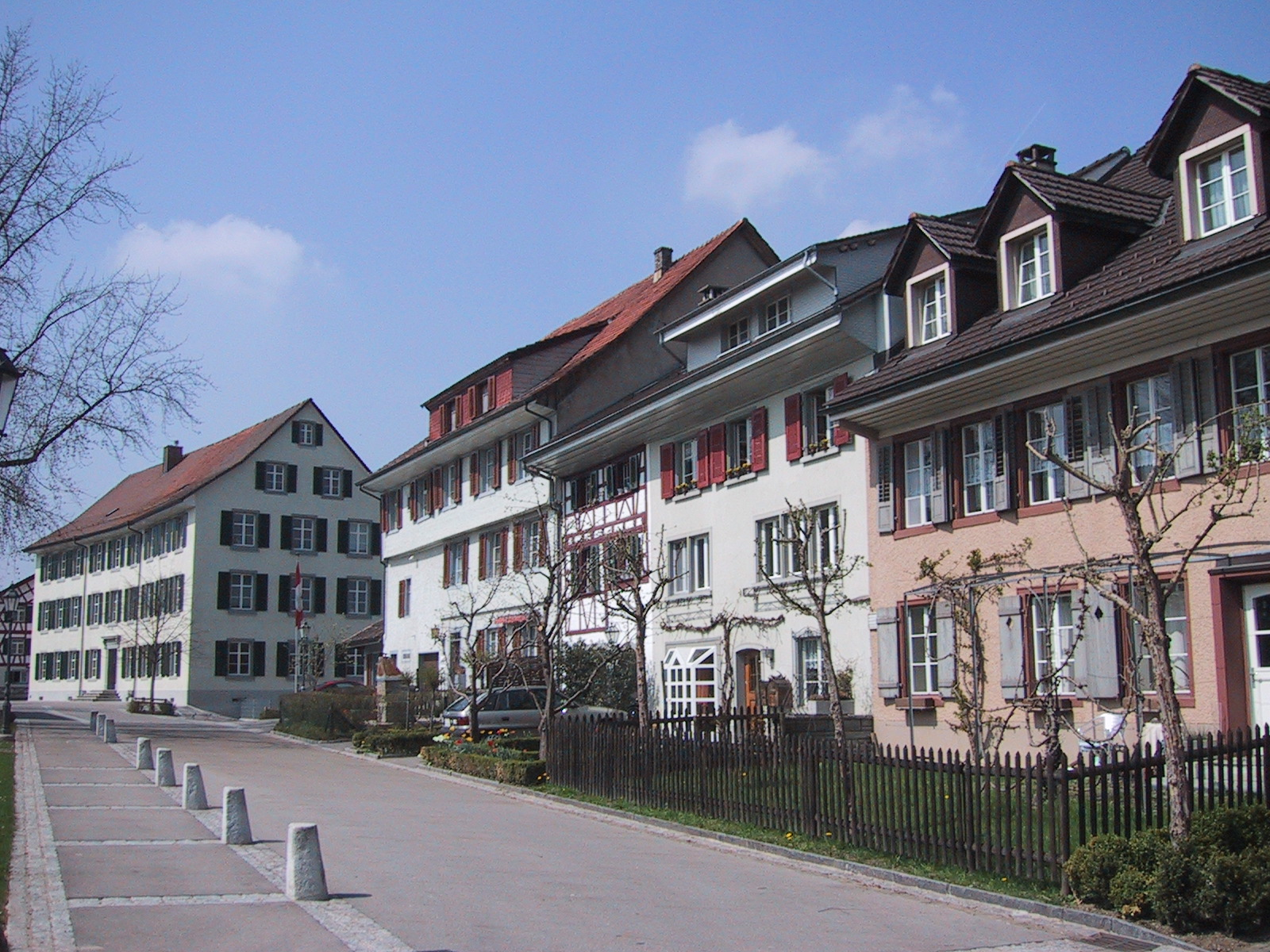

- Coat of arms
- Location of Pfyn
- Location within Switzerland Location within Canton of Thurgau
- Coordinates: 47°35′N 8°57′E
- Country: Switzerland
- Canton: Thurgau
- District: Steckborn

Area
  - Total: 13.18 km^{2} (5.09 sq mi)
- Elevation: 411 m (1,348 ft)

Population (December 2007)
  - Total: 1,898
  - Density: 144.0/km^{2} (373.0/sq mi)
- Time zone: UTC+01:00 (CET)
  - Summer (DST): UTC+02:00 (CEST)
- Postal code: 8505
- SFOS number: 4841
- ISO 3166 code: CH-TG
- Surrounded by: Felben-Wellhausen, Herdern, Homburg, Hüttlingen, Müllheim, Warth-Weiningen
- Website: www.pfyn.ch

Pfyn is a municipality in Frauenfeld District in the canton of Thurgau in Switzerland.

Pfyn gives its name to the ancient Pfyn culture, one of several Neolithic cultures in Switzerland which centered on intensive pig farming and trading, dating from c. 3900 BC to c. 3500 BC.

Pfyn was also the site of a Roman era frontier outpost, named Ad Fines (Latin: meaning "at the borders")

== History ==
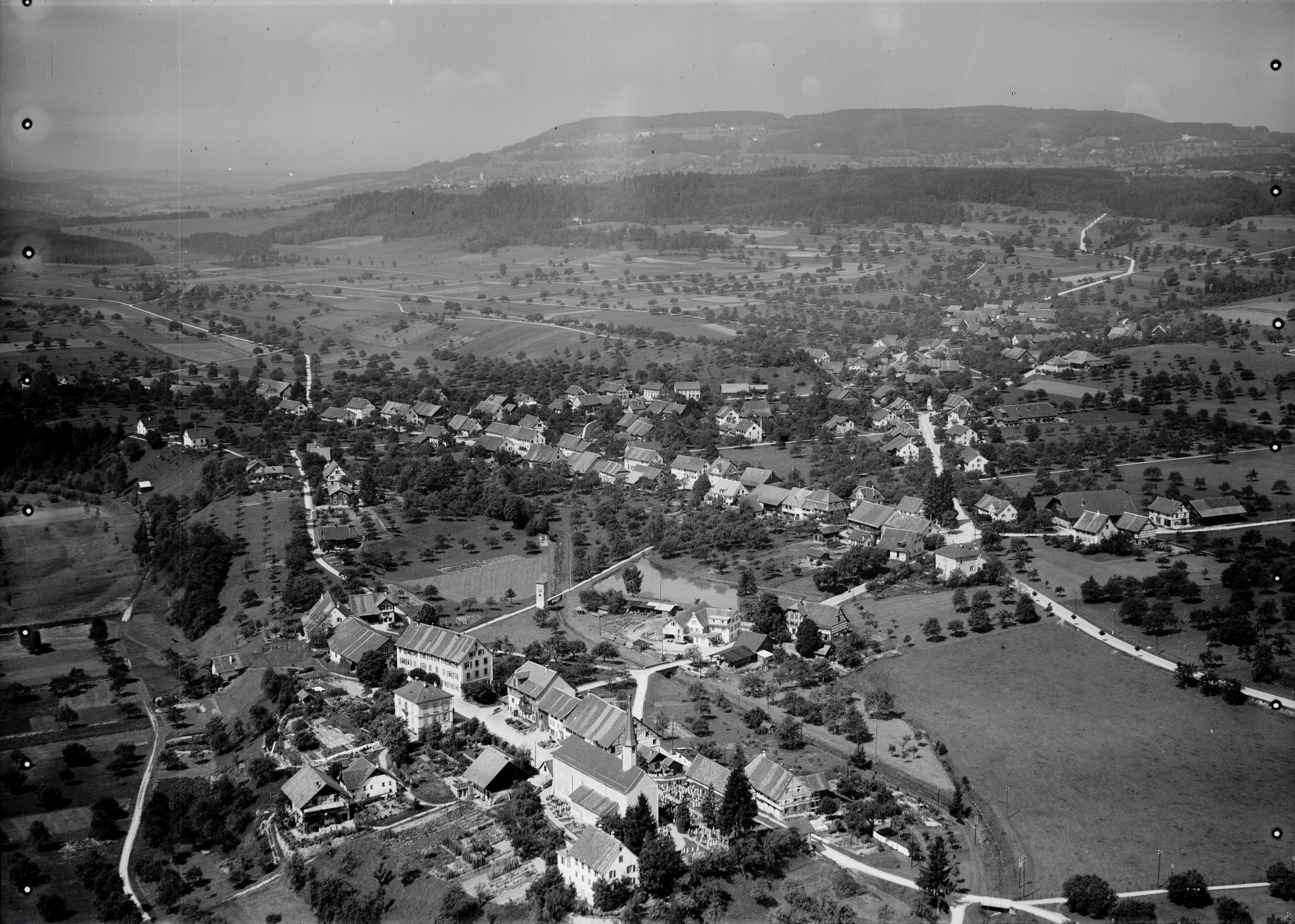
Aerial view from 300 m by Walter Mittelholzer (1934)

=== Pre-Roman Pfyn ===
The oldest traces of a settlement are about 1.5 km (0.93 mi) west of Pfyn in the former peat bog of Breitenloo. Located in a depression carved by a lateral moraine of the Thur glacier, it dates from the Neolithic era (4300 BC). The settlement site was discovered during peat cutting in the late 19th century, but subsequently forgotten. During the war years 1940-41 an attempt to drain the bog to increase arable production land, led to its rediscovery. drainage work on arable production was raised again. In the autumn of 1944, an area of approximately 1,000 square metres (11,000 sq ft) was excavated by interned Polish soldiers led by Charles Keller-Tarnuzzer. Due to the topographical conditions, and an exploratory drilling project in 2002, it appears that about 60% of the settlement area has been excavated.

Keller-Tarnuzzer noted that there was the close relationship of the ceramics with the Michelsberg culture of southern Germany, and believed that the Pfyn finds were a Michelsberg settlement. Around 1960 research determined that the Pfyn ceramics were represented an autonomous culture that was related to the Michelsberg culture. Since that time, the Pfyn-Breitenloo site has been regarded as the center of the Pfyn culture. Further explorations in 2002 and 2004 led to a somewhat more nuanced picture of the settlement. This enabled the site to be dated via dendrochronology. The timbers that were used were cut in 3706-3704 BC. and confirm a single development phase. Another Neolithic settlement must have existed some 400 m (1,300 ft) northwest of Breitenloo. However, the few ceramics discovered at that site are also part of the Pfyn culture. That settlement has never been systematically studied and it is believed that the industrial peat extraction during the second World War may have largely destroyed it.

Because of Pfyn's importance as the home of the Pfyn culture and also as the site of a Roman era fort, other archeological discoveries have been largely ignored. For example, a number of Bronze Age artifacts and scattered grave sites were known to exist, but haven't been studied until recently. Recent excavations have discovered a Bronze Age village and traces of a previously unknown Iron Age settlement.

=== Roman settlement ===
The identification of Ad Fines, which is first mentioned in 280 AD, with Pfyn is undisputed. It is also clear that the place-name refers to the provincial border between the provinces of Raetia, Gallia Belgica and Germania Superior. The course of the Roman road from Oberwinterthur (Vitudurum) to Frauenfeld through Pfyn and on to Arbon (Arbor Felix) is well known. What remains uncertain, however, is the course of a road to Eschenz (Tasgetium), as well the road towards Gotthard Pass via Irgenhausen Castrum, Centum Prata (Kempraten), Obersee–Linth–Walensee. The traces of an imperial settlement almost entirely missing. In addition to references to a farm in the records, some Roman items and parts of a large stone building have been found.

The situation is different for the late-Roman era, where the location of the hill fort outside the town is well known. The hill is now eroded by the Thur and Mühlebach rivers, and has nearly vanished in the south and east. Of the wall, only parts of the north and west still survive. Within the fort many coins and other objects were found that indicate that the fort was occupied Roman soldiers, including mounted troops, from the later 3rd century until the beginning of the 5th century. During this time, the fort connected the rear lines of defense along the Rhine between Arbon and Oberwinterthur (Limes). While nothing is known about the end of the fort, the age of nearby St. Bartholomew's Church indicates that some settlement remained after the fort was abandoned.

=== Pfyn in the middle ages ===
Within the church, a number of medieval graves, have been discovered. The medieval landlord was the Bishop of Constance. In 1414 and 1502 the village received some limited self-government from the local provost. Before 1488 the bailiwick was under the authority of the Ministerialis (unfree knights in the service of a feudal overlord) family of Klingenberg. It was sold in 1488 to Jacob Mötteli. In 1560 the village was acquired by Peter of Gundelfingen, then in 1567 by Count Otto of Eberstein. In 1584 it was bought by Wolf Wambold of Umstadt, and finally in 1614 by the city of Zürich. Under Zurich a Vogt was appointed, who ruled until 1798.

In 1476 a fire destroyed the old town, which had been built on the ruins of the Roman fort. The new village of Pfyn was built northwest of the burned out old city. In 1794-95 the village built a bridge over the Thur river. They were allowed to collect tolls on the bridge until 1850.

St. Bartholomew's Church, which was located within the old Roman fort, was the center of a large Early Middle Ages parish. It included the villages of Felben, Wellhausen, Hüttlingen, Mettendorf, Harenwilen and Eschikofen on the left bank of the Thur and Weiningen, Lanzenneunforn, Gündelhart, Hörhausen, Hörstetten, Dettighofen and Müllheim on the right. After the founding of Reichenau Abbey, Hüttlingen and Müllheim separated from the Pfyn parish. During the Middle Ages, parsonages were established in Felben, Gündelhart and Weiningen, all of which became independent later. In 1155 the Cathedral Chapter of Constance gained rights over the church in Pfyn, including the right to appoint the priest. They invested a canon who would serve as a vicar for Constance. The rights to appoint the church's priest went to the Canton in 1804 and to the parish itself in 1840. In 1528 the Protestant Reformation entered the village and for a short time the village converted. However, the villages belonging to the parish, such as Gündelhart and Hörstetten remained predominantly Catholic. Within 5 years, in 1533, a Catholic priest was again in Pfyn. The church was shared between the two denominations, a situation that remains today.

== Geography ==
Pfyn has an area, as of 2009, of 13.18 square kilometers (5.09 sq mi). Of this area, 7.84 km^{2} (3.03 sq mi) or 59.5% is used for agricultural purposes, while 3.98 km^{2} (1.54 sq mi) or 30.2% is forested. Of the rest of the land, 1.05 km^{2} (0.41 sq mi) or 8.0% is settled (buildings or roads), 0.19 km^{2} (0.073 sq mi) or 1.4% is either rivers or lakes and 0.08 km^{2} (20 acres) or 0.6% is unproductive land.

Of the built up area, industrial buildings made up 4.5% of the total area while housing and buildings made up 0.5% and transportation infrastructure made up 0.3%. while parks, green belts and sports fields made up 2.6%. Out of the forested land, 28.8% of the total land area is heavily forested and 1.4% is covered with orchards or small clusters of trees. Of the agricultural land, 56.3% is used for growing crops, while 3.2% is used for orchards or vine crops. All the water in the municipality is flowing water. Of the unproductive areas, and .

The municipality is located in Steckborn District, on the Thur river between Frauenfeld and Steckborn. It consists of the village of Pfyn and the hamlets of Herdern, Lanzenneunforn, Weiningen and Dettighofen.

== Demographics ==
Pfyn has a population (as of December 2020) of 2,103 As of 2008, 10.9% of the population are foreign nationals. Over the last 10 years (1997–2007) the population has changed at a rate of 11.7%. Most of the population (as of 2000) speaks German(93.0%), with Albanian being second most common ( 2.7%) and Italian being third ( 0.8%).

As of 2008, the gender distribution of the population was 50.3% male and 49.7% female. The population was made up of 855 Swiss men (44.4% of the population), and 113 (5.9%) non-Swiss men. There were 860 Swiss women (44.7%), and 96 (5.0%) non-Swiss women. In 2008 there were 10 live births to Swiss citizens and 3 births to non-Swiss citizens, and in same time span there were 12 deaths of Swiss citizens. Ignoring immigration and emigration, the population of Swiss citizens decreased by 2 while the foreign population increased by 3. There was 1 Swiss man, 1 Swiss woman who emigrated from Switzerland to another country, 8 non-Swiss men who emigrated from Switzerland to another country and 10 non-Swiss women who emigrated from Switzerland to another country. The total Swiss population change in 2008 (from all sources) was an increase of 28 and the non-Swiss population change was a decrease of 8 people. This represents a population growth rate of 1.1%.

The age distribution, as of 2009, in Pfyn is; 215 children or 11.1% of the population are between 0 and 9 years old and 245 teenagers or 12.7% are between 10 and 19. Of the adult population, 230 people or 11.9% of the population are between 20 and 29 years old. 255 people or 13.2% are between 30 and 39, 360 people or 18.6% are between 40 and 49, and 275 people or 14.2% are between 50 and 59. The senior population distribution is 179 people or 9.3% of the population are between 60 and 69 years old, 97 people or 5.0% are between 70 and 79, there are 68 people or 3.5% who are between 80 and 89, and there are 9 people or 0.5% who are 90 and older.

As of 2000 the average number of residents per living room was 0.57 which is about equal to the cantonal average of 0.56 per room. In this case, a room is defined as space of a housing unit of at least 4 m^{2} (43 sq ft) as normal bedrooms, dining rooms, living rooms, kitchens and habitable cellars and attics. About 53% of the total households were owner occupied, or in other words did not pay rent (though they may have a mortgage or a rent-to-own agreement).

As of 2000, there were 687 private households in the municipality, and an average of 2.6 persons per household. In 2000 there were 296 single family homes (or 82.9% of the total) out of a total of 357 inhabited buildings. There were 24 two family buildings (6.7%), 14 three family buildings (3.9%) and 23 multi-family buildings (or 6.4%). There were 358 (or 19.8%) persons who were part of a couple without children, and 1,101 (or 61.0%) who were part of a couple with children. There were 94 (or 5.2%) people who lived in single parent home, while there are 18 persons who were adult children living with one or both parents, 4 persons who lived in a household made up of relatives, 22 who lived in a household made up of unrelated persons, and 22 who are either institutionalized or live in another type of collective housing. The vacancy rate for the municipality, in 2008, was 3.27%. As of 2007, the construction rate of new housing units was 10 new units per 1000 residents.

In 2000 there were 720 apartments in the municipality. The most common apartment size was the 5-room apartment of which there were 176. There were 6 single room apartments and 161 apartments with six or more rooms. As of 2000 the average price to rent an average apartment in Pfyn was 1124.09 Swiss francs (CHF) per month (US$900, £510, €720 approx. exchange rate from 2000). The average rate for a one-room apartment was 558.33 CHF (US$450, £250, €360), a two-room apartment was about 809.86 CHF (US$650, £360, €520), a three-room apartment was about 1001.78 CHF (US$800, £450, €640) and a six or more room apartment cost an average of 1543.85 CHF (US$1240, £690, €990). The average apartment price in Pfyn was 100.7% of the national average of 1116 CHF.

In the 2007 federal election the most popular party was the SVP which received 49.06% of the vote. The next three most popular parties were the CVP (11.56%), the SP (10.39%) and the Green Party (9.69%). In the federal election, a total of 625 votes were cast, and the voter turnout was 46.6%.

The historical population is given in the following table:

year	population
1850	789
1860	810
1870	868
1880	877
1890	857
1900	891
1950	1,187
1960	1,247
1980	1,198
1990	1,578
2000	1,804

== Heritage sites of national significance ==
The Ad Fines (a late-Roman fortress), the Breitenloo (a prehistoric lake shore settlement) and the shared or ecumenical (German: Paritätische) church of St. Bartholomäus are listed as Swiss heritage sites of national significance.

The Ad Fines hill is now eroded by the Thur and Mühlebach rivers, and has nearly vanished in the south and east. Of the wall, only parts of the north and west still survive. It was not until the excavations of the 1976, 1980–81 and 1990–92, that the fort was better understood. The walls were about 3 m (9.8 ft) high. A total of six semi-circular towers are known, though location of the gate and the moat are still unknown. Very little is known about the layout and type of buildings that were within the approximately 15,000 m^{2} (160,000 sq ft) area enclosed by the walls. A sod fountain and the remains of wooden buildings are all that has been found. The castle was also found along with a small, neighboring cemetery. Many coins and other objects found in the cemetery and the rest of the interior indicate that the fort was occupied Roman soldiers, including mounted troops, from the later 3rd century until the beginning of the 5th century.

In 1944, the prehistoric site at Breitenloo was excavated and 17 different houses were found. The houses are located along a north–south main street with the gables facing the street. The buildings are almost exclusively built with two naves and have lengths of 4–11 meters (13–36 ft) and widths from 3.5–5.5 meters (11–18 ft). It is striking that several houses of vastly different sizes lay side by side, suggesting perhaps larger homes with smaller farm buildings. The house floors were all built with complex support structures and overlying split boards, which were usually covered with clay. Midden heaps in the soil and partial scorch marks on the support structures suggest that at least some buildings were lifted quite high off the ground.

== Economy ==
As of 2007, Pfyn had an unemployment rate of 0.93%. As of 2005, there were 134 people employed in the primary economic sector and about 50 businesses involved in this sector. 343 people are employed in the secondary sector and there are 27 businesses in this sector. 216 people are employed in the tertiary sector, with 53 businesses in this sector.

In 2000 there were 1,336 workers who lived in the municipality. Of these, 677 or about 50.7% of the residents worked outside Pfyn while 326 people commuted into the municipality for work. There were a total of 985 jobs (of at least 6 hours per week) in the municipality. Of the working population, 8.9% used public transportation to get to work, and 54.7% used a private car.

== Religion ==
From the 2000 census, 521 or 28.9% were Roman Catholic, while 854 or 47.3% belonged to the Swiss Reformed Church. Of the rest of the population, there was 1 individual who belonged to the Christian Catholic faith there are 12 individuals (or about 0.67% of the population) who belong to the Orthodox Church, and there are 118 individuals (or about 6.54% of the population) who belong to another Christian church. There were 87 (or about 4.82% of the population) who are Islamic. There are 6 individuals (or about 0.33% of the population) who belong to another church (not listed on the census), 144 (or about 7.98% of the population) belong to no church, are agnostic or atheist, and 61 individuals (or about 3.38% of the population) did not answer the question.

== Education ==
In Pfyn about 78.1% of the population (between age 25–64) have completed either non-mandatory upper secondary education or additional higher education (either university or a Fachhochschule).

Pfyn is home to the Pfyn primary school district. In the 2008/2009 school year there are 146 students. There are 36 children in the kindergarten, and the average class size is 18 kindergartners. Of the children in kindergarten, 24 or 66.7% are female, 4 or 11.1% are not Swiss citizens and 5 or 13.9% do not speak German natively. The lower and upper primary levels begin at about age 5-6 and lasts for 6 years. There are 55 children in who are at the lower primary level and 55 children in the upper primary level. The average class size in the primary school is 20 students. At the lower primary level, there are 28 children or 50.9% of the total population who are female, 4 or 7.3% are not Swiss citizens and 4 or 7.3% do not speak German natively. In the upper primary level, there are 26 or 47.3% who are female, 9 or 16.4% are not Swiss citizens and 7 or 12.7% do not speak German natively.

== See also ==
- Nature parks in Switzerland
