= Johannes Stuker =

Swiss teacher and pedagogue

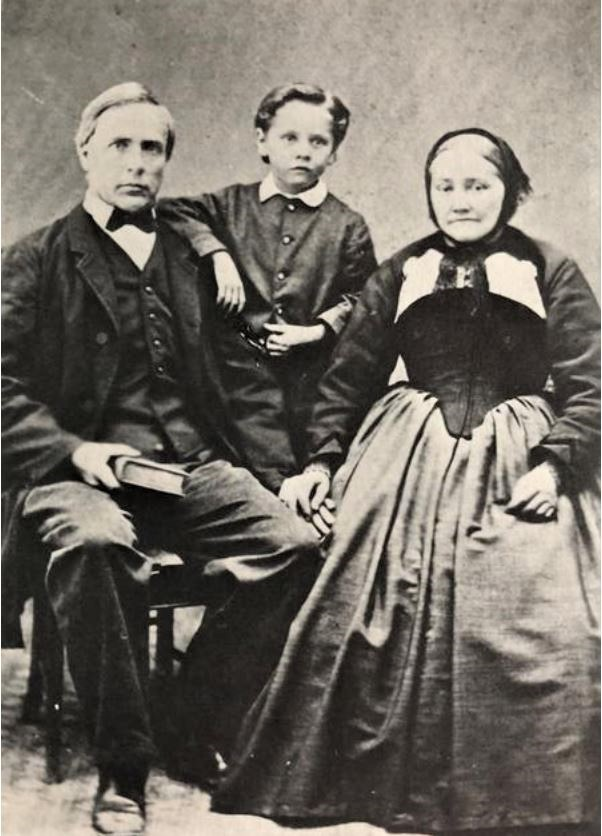
- Born: April 10, 1819; Bowil, Canton of Bern, Switzerland
- Died: December 1, 1901 (aged 82); Langnau im Emmental, Canton of Bern, Switzerland
- Occupations: Pedagogue, teacher
- Spouse: Verena Iseli
- Children: Robert Stuker

Johannes Stuker (10 April 1819 – 1 December 1901) was a Swiss pedagogue and primary school teacher from Bowil. He served as the principal teacher in Grünenmatt for nearly five decades and became known throughout the Canton of Bern as an expert in both educational and agricultural matters.

== Early life and education ==
Johannes Stuker was born on 10 April 1819 in Bowil, the eldest of five sons to Christian Stuker, a farmer, and Anna née Mosimann. He began his teaching career early, working at the primary school in Heimberg near Thun from 1836 to 1838. In October 1837, he obtained his teaching certificate and subsequently served as a second teacher in Lützelflüh from 1838 to 1841.

== Teaching career ==
In 1841, Stuker was appointed principal teacher in Grünenmatt, a village near Lützelflüh, where he would serve for 47 years until 1888. His pedagogical talents were recognized by Albert Bitzius (known by the pseudonym Jeremias Gotthelf), who served as pastor of Lützelflüh and school commissioner. Bitzius encouraged Stuker and developed a friendship with him that would prove influential in the young teacher's career.

Stuker maintained contact with educational reformer Philipp Emanuel von Fellenberg, visiting his training establishments at Hofwil multiple times and exchanging ideas on agricultural and educational topics. With Bitzius's support, Stuker attended a professional development course in 1844 at the teacher training college in Kreuzlingen, which was directed by Johann Jakob Wehrli. Following this experience, he maintained regular correspondence with Wehrli.

== Personal life ==
In 1845, Johannes Stuker married Verena Iseli, daughter of Jakob Iseli, a prosperous farmer and assessor from Pfaffenboden, near Grünenmatt. The couple had one son, Robert Stuker, born in 1863, who would later become a tutor to princes of the royal family at the court of Greece.

== Broader contributions ==
Beyond his classroom duties, Stuker became recognized as an expert in agricultural questions and was admitted to the Economic Society of Bern in 1847. He organized lectures on continuing education for teachers in the region and served as choir director and theater director in Grünenmatt. At the request of the Department of the Interior, he conducted courses throughout the canton in 1879 on possible improvements in agriculture and horticulture.

Stuker was appointed to the cantonal school synod in 1880. In 1887, he published Selbstverfasste Gespräche und ausgewählte Gedichte zu dramatisch-deklamatorischen Aufführungen für Schule und Haus (Self-composed Conversations and Selected Poems for Dramatic-Declamatory Performances for School and Home), a collection of conversations and poems for theatrical performances in schools and homes.

== Death ==
Johannes Stuker died on 1 December 1901 in Langnau im Emmental at the age of 82.

== Bibliography ==
- Stuker, Johannes: "Versuch zur Beantwortung der Preisfrage: 'Welchen Einfluss übt die wachsende Armennoth auf das Volksschulwesen, und welche Bestimmpunkte ergeben sich daraus für die Wirksamkeit des Lehrers'" (final part), in: Volksschulblatt, 2, 1855/31, pp. 243–246.
- Stuker, Johannes: Selbstverfasste Gespräche und ausgewählte Gedichte zu dramatisch-deklamatorischen Aufführungen für Schule und Haus, 1887.
