= Bissegg =

- Village
- Location in Switzerland
- Coordinates: 47°34′N 9°03′E
- Country: Switzerland
- Canton: Canton of Thurgau
- Municipality: Amlikon-Bissegg
- First recorded: 1324 (as Bynnsegge)

Bissegg is a village and former municipality in the canton of Thurgau, Switzerland.

== History ==
The village was first recorded in year 1324 as Bynssegge.

The municipality Bissegg contained the villages Bissegg, Holzhäusern, Hünikon and Junkholz. It had 205 inhabitants in 1870, which decreased to 187 in 1900 and 138 in 1920. It then increased, to 153 in 1950, 161 in 1960 and 185 in 1990.

In 1995 the municipality was merged with the other, neighboring municipalities Amlikon, Griesenberg and Strohwilen to form a new and larger municipality Amlikon-Bissegg.
