= Felben =

Coordinates: 47°35′N 8°56′E

Felben is a village and former municipality in the canton of Thurgau, Switzerland.

It was first recorded in the year 1178 as Veluen. In 1433 it was known as Felwan.

The municipality had 200 inhabitants in 1850, which increased to 281 in 1900, 424 in 1950 and 525 in 1980.

In 1983 the municipality was merged with the neighboring municipality Wellhausen to form a new and larger municipality Felben-Wellhausen.
