= Harenwilen =

Village in Thurgau, Switzerland

- Former municipality
- Location of Harenwilen
- Location within Switzerland Location within Canton of Thurgau
- Coordinates: 47.5725°N 9.0016°E
- Country: Switzerland
- Canton: Thurgau
- District: Frauenfeld
- Municipality: Hüttlingen

Population (1990)
  - Total: 60
- Time zone: UTC+01:00 (CET)
  - Summer (DST): UTC+02:00 (CEST)
- ISO 3166 code: CH-TG
- Website

Harenwilen is a former Ortsgemeinde (local commune) in the canton of Thurgau, Switzerland, which has been part of the municipality of Hüttlingen in the district of Frauenfeld since 1999. The clustered village lies on the northern flank of the Wellenberg. Together with Buchschorren, Burghof, Krattenhof and Neuhof, Harenwilen was an Ortsgemeinde of the Munizipalgemeinde (municipal commune) of Hüttlingen until 1998.

== History ==
Harenwilen is first mentioned in 1375 as Wille(r). In the Middle Ages the seat of the lords of Ochsenhard (1246–1415), who were in the service of the lords of Griesenberg, stood not far from Burghof; the castle fell into ruin in the 16th century. Before 1798 Harenwilen belonged to the Hohe Gerichte (high courts), which were directly subject to the Confederate bailiff (Landvogt) in Thurgau. Harenwilen always belonged to the parish of Hüttlingen and shared its fate in church matters.

Arable farming predominated until the 19th century, followed increasingly by livestock and dairy farming. A sawmill was also operated in Harenwilen. Agriculture, still the main source of income, has shaped the character of the village to this day.

Harenwilen had 91 inhabitants in 1850, 93 in 1900, 79 in 1950 and 60 in 1990.

== Bibliography ==
- Die Thurgauer Gemeinden und ihre Wappen, 1988, p. 116
