= Felben-Wellhausen =

- Municipality
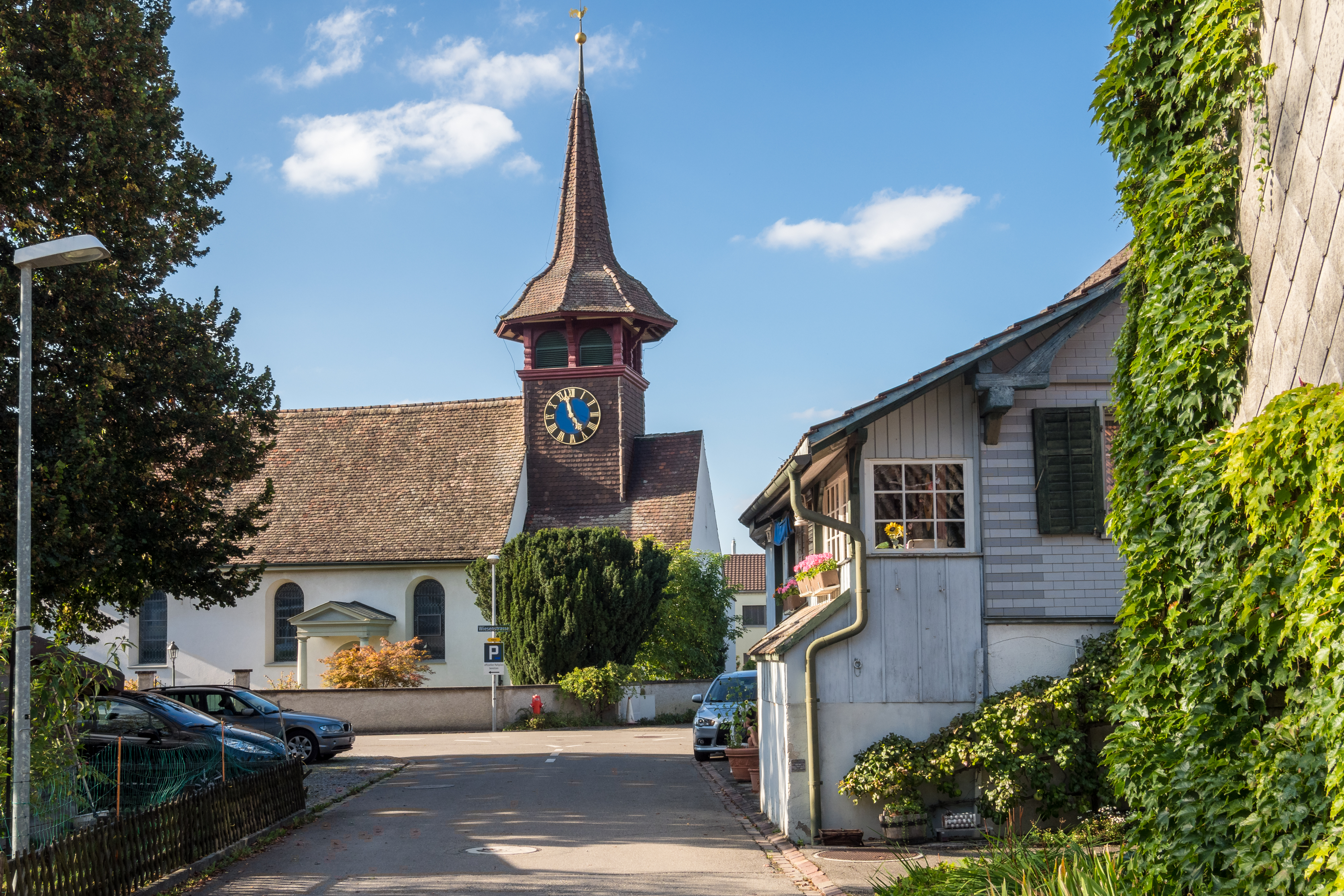
- Church in Felben

- Coat of arms
- Location of Felben-Wellhausen
- Location within Switzerland Location within Canton of Thurgau
- Coordinates: 47°35′N 8°56′E
- Country: Switzerland
- Canton: Thurgau
- District: Frauenfeld

Area
  - Total: 7.3 km^{2} (2.8 sq mi)
- Elevation: 395 m (1,296 ft)

Population (December 2007)
  - Total: 2,286
  - Density: 310/km^{2} (810/sq mi)
- Time zone: UTC+01:00 (CET)
  - Summer (DST): UTC+02:00 (CEST)
- Postal code: 8552
- SFOS number: 4561
- ISO 3166 code: CH-TG
- Localities: Felben, Wellhausen
- Surrounded by: Frauenfeld, Hüttlingen, Pfyn, Thundorf, Warth-Weiningen
- Website: www.felben-wellhausen.ch

Felben-Wellhausen is a municipality in the district of Frauenfeld in the canton of Thurgau in Switzerland.

The municipality was created in 1983 by a merger of Felben and Wellhausen.

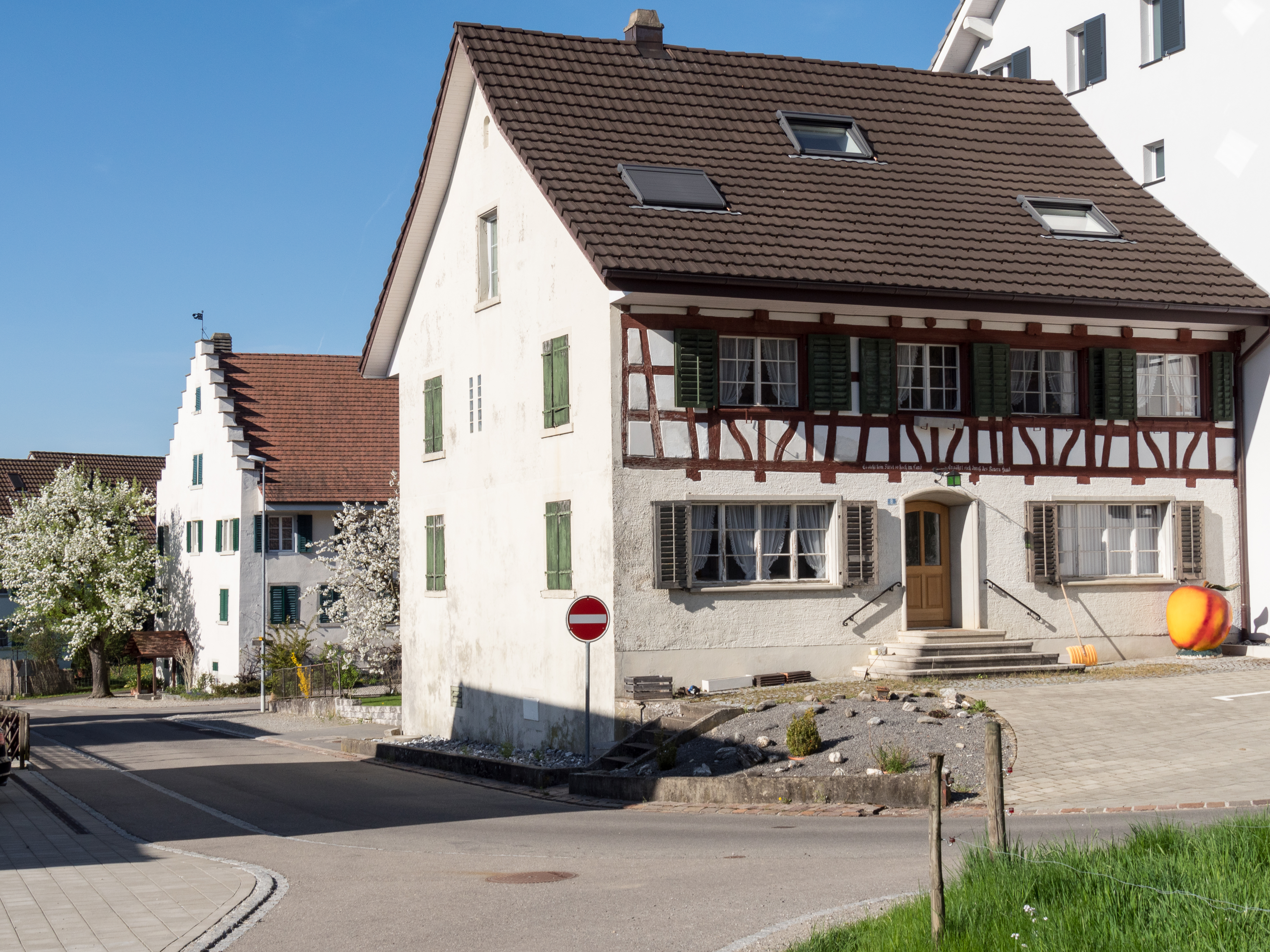
Village center of Wellhausen

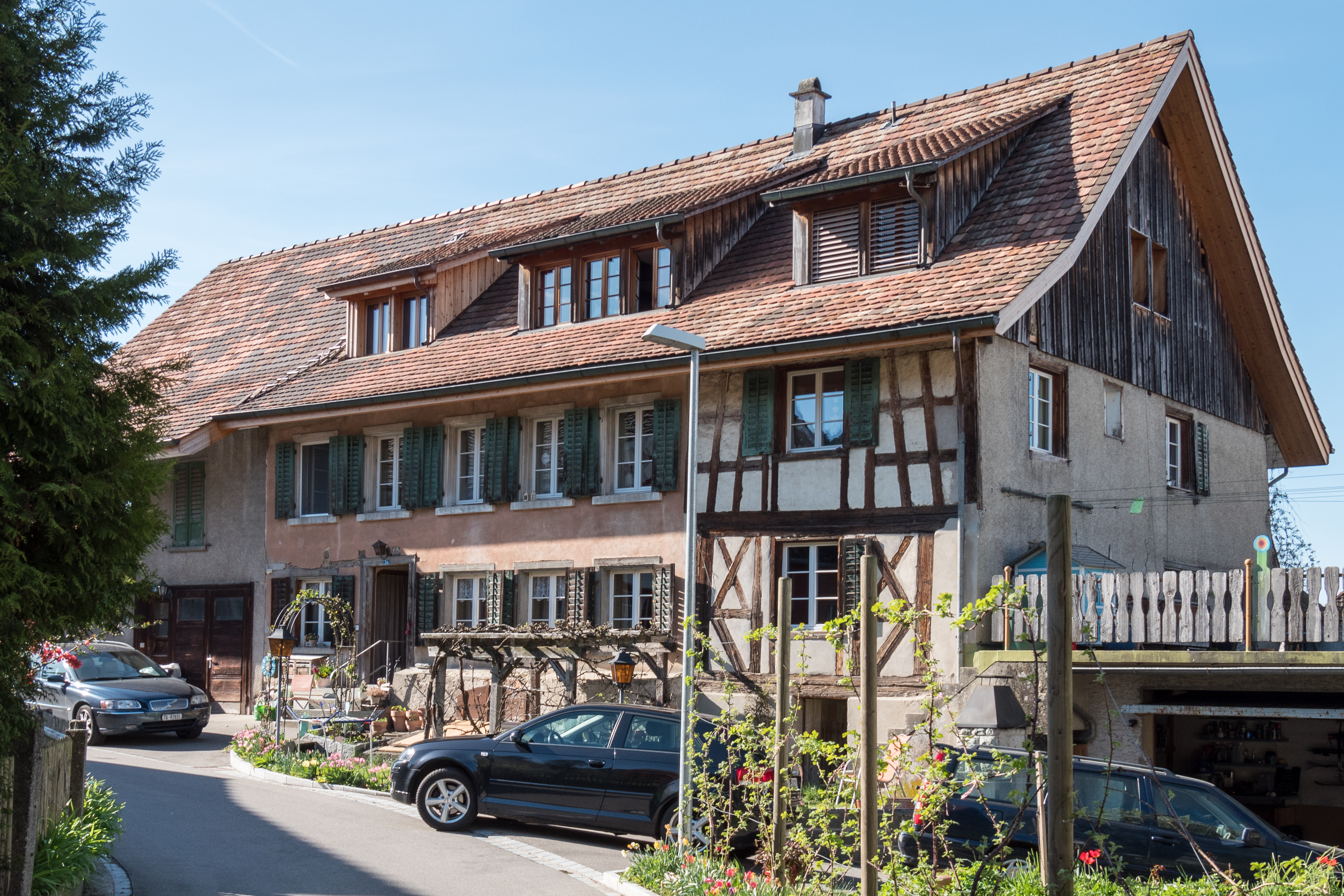
Farm house in Wellhausen

== History ==
Roman era coins have been found in the municipality. The modern village of Felben is first mentioned in 1178 as Veluen. In 1433 it was mentioned as Felwan. In 1178 Alt St. Johann monastery in the Toggenburg region became the landlord of the village. From the Late Middle Ages until 1798, the courts for the village were held in the city of Frauenfeld. Prior to the Protestant Reformation Felben, which probably had a chapel starting in the 9th century, belonged to the parish of Pfyn. By no later than 1569, Felben and Wellhausen formed a Reformed parish. The priest of the parish was appointed by the Herrschaft of Wellenberg and the city of Frauenfeld. The Catholics in Felben were part of the Catholic parish of Frauenfeld. Until the 19th century most of the surrounding fields were planted with grain in a three-field system. After 1860, this was partially replaced by livestock and dairy farming. Several drainage and amelioration projects (1909, 1920–25 and 1969–83) opened up additional land for agriculture. After 1940 sugar beets were planted in many of the new fields. By 1900, several other industries had moved into Felben, including embroidery, a brick factory and sand pit work.

== Geography ==
Felben-Wellhausen has an area, as of 2009, of 7.38 square kilometers (2.85 sq mi). Of this area, 4.2 km^{2} (1.6 sq mi) or 56.9% is used for agricultural purposes, while 1.89 km^{2} (0.73 sq mi) or 25.6% is forested. Of the rest of the land, 1.01 km^{2} (0.39 sq mi) or 13.7% is settled (buildings or roads), 0.2 km^{2} (0.077 sq mi) or 2.7% is either rivers or lakes and 0.04 km^{2} (9.9 acres) or 0.5% is unproductive land.

Of the built up area, industrial buildings made up 5.3% of the total area while housing and buildings made up 1.9% and transportation infrastructure made up 0.5%. while parks, green belts and sports fields made up 5.7%. Out of the forested land, 24.5% of the total land area is heavily forested and 1.1% is covered with orchards or small clusters of trees. Of the agricultural land, 55.0% is used for growing crops, while 1.9% is used for orchards or vine crops. Of the water in the municipality, 0.4% is in lakes and 2.3% is in rivers and streams.

The municipality is located in the Frauenfeld district, along the Thur River. Until the Thur Correction project of 1880, the town was routinely flooded by the river. It consists of the villages of Felben and Wellhausen which merged in 1983 to form Felben-Wellhausen.

== Demographics ==
Felben-Wellhausen has a population (as of December 2020) of 2,874. As of 2008, 16.4% of the population are foreign nationals. Over the last 10 years (1997–2007) the population has changed at a rate of 23.1%. Most of the population (as of 2000) speaks German (89.2%), with Italian being second most common ( 2.5%) and Serbo-Croatian being third ( 2.0%).

As of 2008, the gender distribution of the population was 50.7% male and 49.3% female. The population was made up of 990 Swiss men (42.3% of the population), and 198 (8.5%) non-Swiss men. There were 969 Swiss women (41.4%), and 186 (7.9%) non-Swiss women.

In 2008 there were 15 live births to Swiss citizens and 5 births to non-Swiss citizens, and in same time span there were 6 deaths of Swiss citizens and 2 non-Swiss citizen deaths. Ignoring immigration and emigration, the population of Swiss citizens increased by 9 while the foreign population increased by 3. There were 5 Swiss men who emigrated from Switzerland to another country, 16 non-Swiss men who emigrated from Switzerland to another country and 16 non-Swiss women who emigrated from Switzerland to another country. The total Swiss population change in 2008 (from all sources) was a decrease of 21 and the non-Swiss population change was an increase of 55 people. This represents a population growth rate of 1.5%.

The age distribution, as of 2009, in Felben-Wellhausen is; 246 children or 10.3% of the population are between 0 and 9 years old and 323 teenagers or 13.5% are between 10 and 19. Of the adult population, 310 people or 12.9% of the population are between 20 and 29 years old. 309 people or 12.9% are between 30 and 39, 444 people or 18.5% are between 40 and 49, and 383 people or 16.0% are between 50 and 59. The senior population distribution is 212 people or 8.9% of the population are between 60 and 69 years old, 100 people or 4.2% are between 70 and 79, there are 59 people or 2.5% who are between 80 and 89, and there are 8 people or 0.3% who are 90 and older.

As of 2000, there were 839 private households in the municipality, and an average of 2.5 persons per household. In 2000 there were 316 single family homes (or 79.0% of the total) out of a total of 400 inhabited buildings. There were 21 two family buildings (5.3%), 11 three family buildings (2.8%) and 52 multi-family buildings (or 13.0%). There were 507 (or 23.6%) persons who were part of a couple without children, and 1,277 (or 59.5%) who were part of a couple with children. There were 93 (or 4.3%) people who lived in single parent home, while there are 2 persons who were adult children living with one or both parents, 4 persons who lived in a household made up of relatives, 21 who lived in a household made up of unrelated persons, and 19 who are either institutionalized or live in another type of collective housing.

The vacancy rate for the municipality, in 2008, was 1.63%. As of 2007, the construction rate of new housing units was 6.1 new units per 1000 residents. In 2000 there were 884 apartments in the municipality. The most common apartment size was the 4 room apartment of which there were 244. There were 24 single room apartments and 120 apartments with six or more rooms. As of 2000 the average price to rent an average apartment in Felben-Wellhausen was 1003.64 Swiss francs (CHF) per month (US$800, £450, €640 approx. exchange rate from 2000). The average rate for a one-room apartment was 522.27 CHF (US$420, £240, €330), a two-room apartment was about 805.71 CHF (US$640, £360, €520), a three-room apartment was about 917.76 CHF (US$730, £410, €590) and a six or more room apartment cost an average of 1562.08 CHF (US$1250, £700, €1000). The average apartment price in Felben-Wellhausen was 89.9% of the national average of 1116 CHF.

In the 2007 federal election the most popular party was the SVP which received 44.35% of the vote. The next three most popular parties were the SP (15.73%), the CVP (10.12%) and the Green Party (9.49%). In the federal election, a total of 667 votes were cast, and the voter turnout was 43.5%.

The historical population is given in the following table:

year	population
1850	479
1900	573
1950	778
1980	1,161
1990	1,550
2000	2,145

== Economy ==
As of 2007, Felben-Wellhausen had an unemployment rate of 1.84%. As of 2005, there were 55 people employed in the primary economic sector and about 15 businesses involved in this sector. 791 people are employed in the secondary sector and there are 30 businesses in this sector. 241 people are employed in the tertiary sector, with 52 businesses in this sector.

In 2000 there were 1,567 workers who lived in the municipality. Of these, 916 or about 58.5% of the residents worked outside Felben-Wellhausen while 922 people commuted into the municipality for work. There were a total of 1,573 jobs (of at least 6 hours per week) in the municipality. Of the working population, 15.6% used public transportation to get to work, and 51.2% used a private car.

== Religion ==
From the 2000 census, 576 or 26.9% were Roman Catholic, while 1,058 or 49.3% belonged to the Swiss Reformed Church. Of the rest of the population, there was 1 Old Catholic who belonged to the Christian Catholic Church of Switzerland there are 54 individuals (or about 2.52% of the population) who belong to the Orthodox Church, and there are 87 individuals (or about 4.06% of the population) who belong to another Christian church. There were 2 individuals (or about 0.09% of the population) who were Jewish, and 100 (or about 4.66% of the population) who are Islamic. There are 17 individuals (or about 0.79% of the population) who belong to another church (not listed on the census), 182 (or about 8.48% of the population) belong to no church, are agnostic or atheist, and 68 individuals (or about 3.17% of the population) did not answer the question.

== Education ==
In Felben-Wellhausen about 74.4% of the population (between age 25 and 64) have completed either non-mandatory upper secondary education or additional higher education (either university or a Fachhochschule).

== Transport ==
Felben-Wellhausen railway station is a stop of the Zürich S-Bahn on services S24 and S30.
