= Eschikofen =

Village in Thurgau, Switzerland

- Former municipality
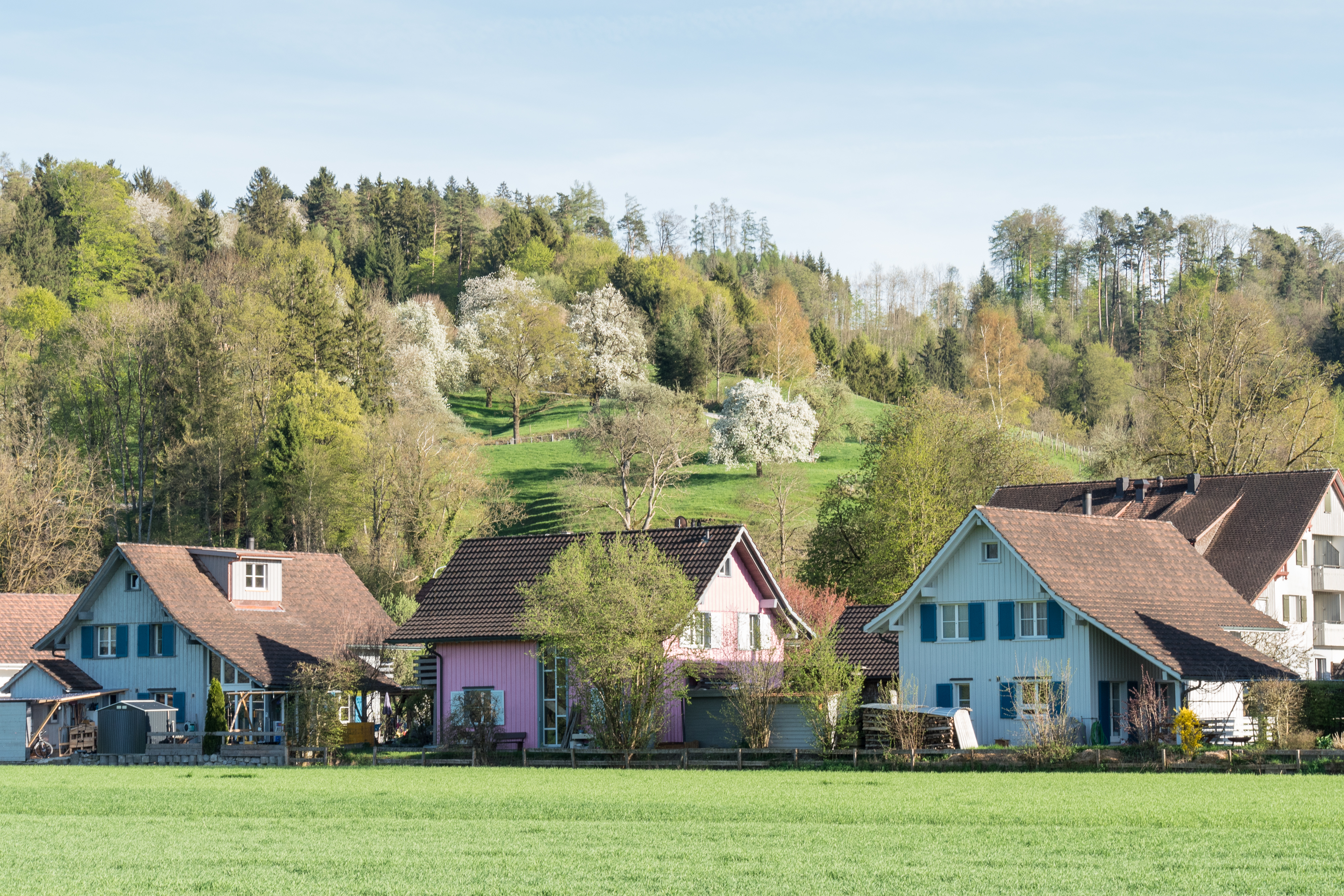
- Wooden houses in Eschikofen

- Coat of arms
- Location of Eschikofen
- Location within Switzerland Location within Canton of Thurgau
- Coordinates: 47.5805°N 9.0065°E
- Country: Switzerland
- Canton: Thurgau
- District: Frauenfeld
- Municipality: Hüttlingen

Population (1990)
  - Total: 130
- Time zone: UTC+01:00 (CET)
  - Summer (DST): UTC+02:00 (CEST)
- SFOS number: 4581
- ISO 3166 code: CH-TG
- Website

Eschikofen is a former Ortsgemeinde (local commune) in the canton of Thurgau, Switzerland, now part of the municipality of Hüttlingen in the district of Frauenfeld. It lies at the northern foot of the Wellenberg, on the main road from Frauenfeld to Weinfelden.

== History ==
Eschikofen is first mentioned in 878 as Hassinchovarromarcha, and in the 19th century it appears as Heschikofen. It belonged to the Abbey of Saint Gall before Reichenau Abbey appeared as its landlord in the 12th century (Offnungen, or records of customary law, of 1430 and 1479). After the incorporation of Reichenau Abbey into the Diocese of Constance in 1540, the low court of Eschikofen belonged until 1798 partly to the bishop of Constance (episcopal Amt of Frauenfeld) and partly to the lordship of Griesenberg.

Eschikofen originally lay in the parish of Pfyn. Since 1531 the mainly Reformed Eschikofen has belonged to the parish of Hüttlingen, and since 1869 its Catholic inhabitants have attended Mass in Müllheim.

In 1837 the ferry across the Thur was replaced by a covered wooden bridge, and in 1954 the concrete bridge was built. Before the correction of the Thur (1907–1913), Eschikofen was often flooded. In the course of the 19th century dairy and livestock farming replaced arable farming. Despite a recent neighborhood of single-family houses, Eschikofen has kept its farming character.

Before 1999 Eschikofen was an Ortsgemeinde within the Munizipalgemeinde (municipal commune) of Hüttlingen, and since then it has been part of the political municipality of Hüttlingen. It had 147 inhabitants in 1850, 157 in 1900, 169 in 1950, 173 in 1960, 109 in 1980 and 130 in 1990.

== Bibliography ==
- Die Thurgauer Gemeinden und ihre Wappen, 1988, 115–116
