= Wellhausen, Switzerland =

Village in Thurgau, Switzerland

Coordinates: 47.574°N 8.946°E

Aerial view from 300 m by Walter Mittelholzer (1924)

Wellhausen is a village and former municipality in the canton of Thurgau, Switzerland.

In 1983 the municipality was merged with the neighboring municipality Felben to form a new and larger municipality Felben-Wellhausen.
