= Fimmelsberg =

Village in the canton of Thurgau, Switzerland

Coordinates: 47.564°N 9.029°E

Fimmelsberg is a village in the canton of Thurgau, Switzerland.

It was first recorded in year 1228 as Vilmarsperc.

Fimmelsberg is located in the former municipality Griesenberg. In 1995 Griesenberg municipality merged with its neighbor to form a new and larger municipality Amlikon-Bissegg.
