= Amlikon =

Village in northern Switzerland

Coordinates: 47°34′11″N 9°3′21.89″E

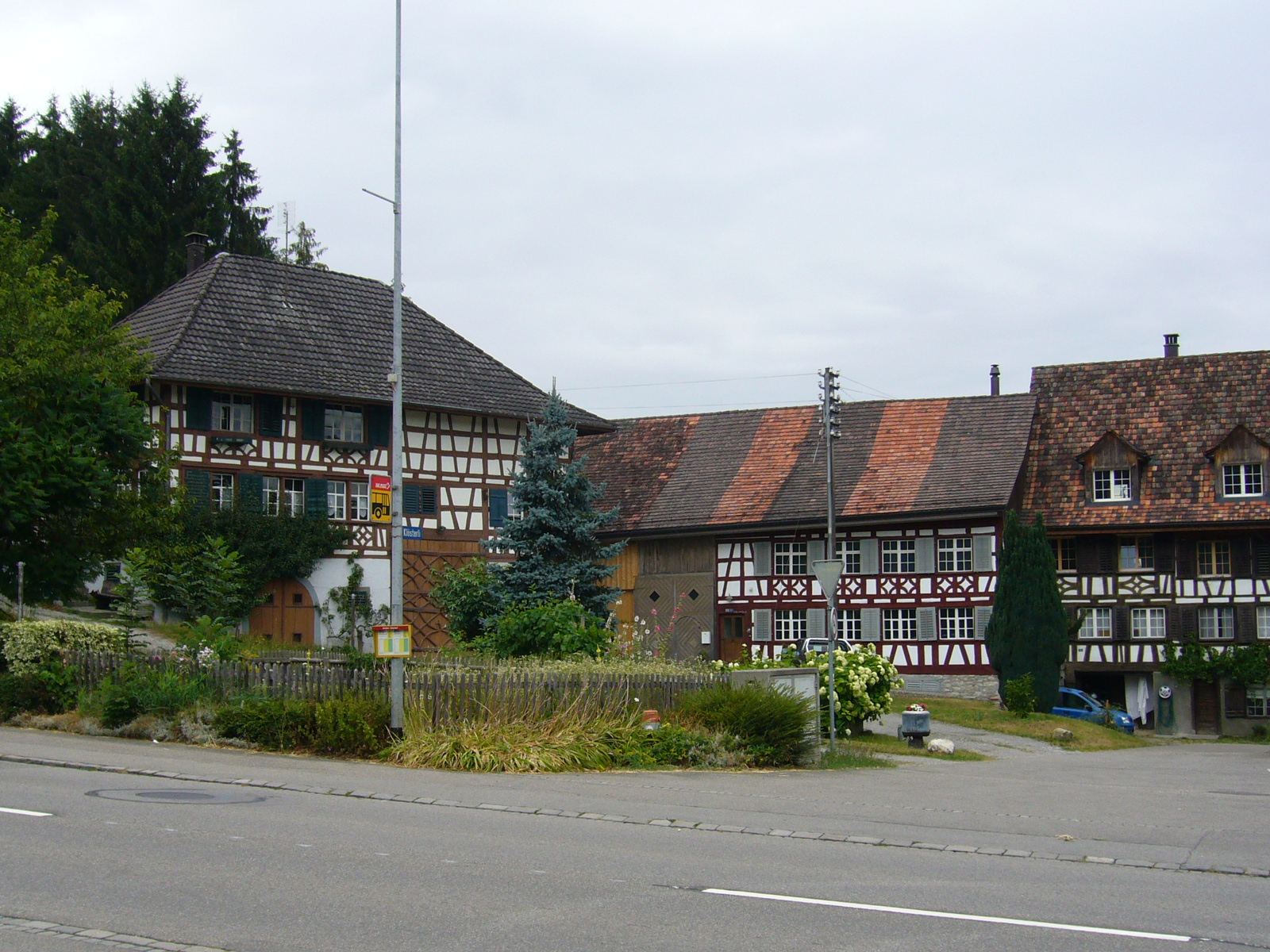
Old houses in Amlikon

Amlikon is a village and former municipality in the canton of Thurgau, Switzerland.

== History ==
In 1995 the municipality was merged with the other, neighboring municipalities Bissegg, Griesenberg and Strohwilen to form a new and larger municipality Amlikon-Bissegg.

It was first recorded in year 1282 as Amlikon.

During the High Middle Ages it was part of the lands of the Baron of Bussnang. From the mid-13th century until 1798, it was part of the court of Griesenberg, which came from a side line of the Bussnang family. Amlikon has always been part of the parish of Bussnang. The ferry over the river Thur in Amlikon, was first mentioned in the 14th century. It was replaced around 1727 by a bridge. The flood of 15 June 1910 destroyed the covered bridge that had been built in 1821. It was replaced in 1911–12 by an iron structure, which was replaced in 1995 by a concrete bridge. The municipality lies on both sides of the Thur River.

Until the 19th century the main economic activities were grain cultivation in a three-field system and hemp production. This was mostly replaced in the 19th century by cattle and dairy farming. The first cheese factory was built in 1908. Wine grapes are cultivated today. In the 19th century there was an oil press. The steep lane to the village was replaced in 1832 by the S-shaped village street. At the turn of the 20th century there were several local embroidery shops. However, larger factories did not permanently settle in the village.

== Historic population ==
The municipality had 278 inhabitants in 1850, which increased to 303 in 1900, decreased to 258 in 1970, but rose again, to 352 in 1990.
