= Amlikon-Bissegg =

- Municipality
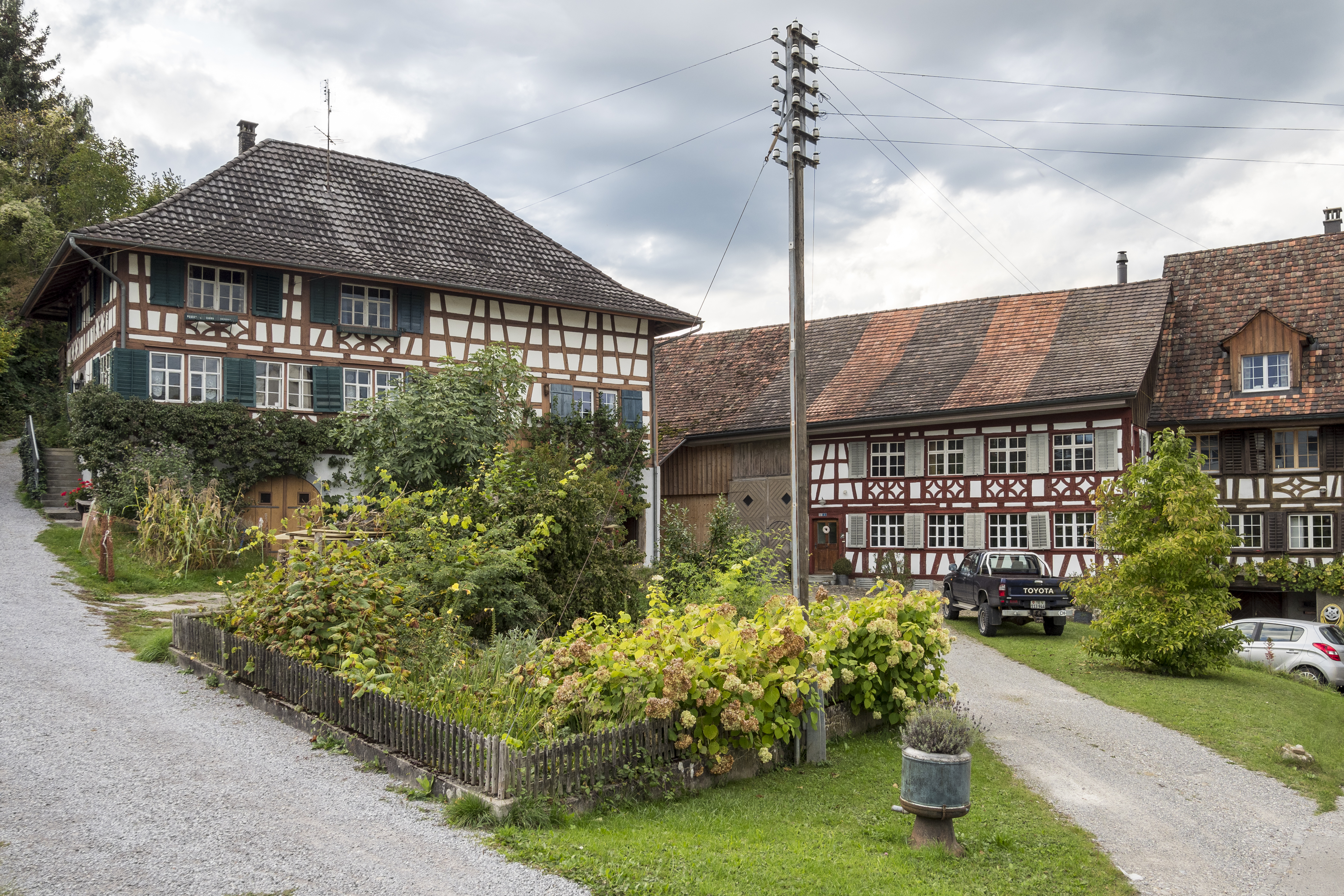
- Amlikon village

- Coat of arms
- Location of Amlikon-Bissegg
- Location within Switzerland Location within Canton of Thurgau
- Coordinates: 47°34′N 9°3′E
- Country: Switzerland
- Canton: Thurgau
- District: Weinfelden

Area
  - Total: 14.43 km^{2} (5.57 sq mi)
- Elevation: 422 m (1,385 ft)

Population (December 2007)
  - Total: 1,223
  - Density: 84.75/km^{2} (219.5/sq mi)
- Time zone: UTC+01:00 (CET)
  - Summer (DST): UTC+02:00 (CEST)
- Postal code: 8514
- SFOS number: 4881
- ISO 3166 code: CH-TG
- Localities: Amlikon, Bissegg, Holzhäusern, Hünikon, Junkholz, Griesenberg, Altenburg, Bänikon, Fimmelsberg, Holzhof, Leutmerken, Tümpfel, Strohwilen
- Surrounded by: Affeltrangen, Bussnang, Hüttlingen, Märstetten, Müllheim, Thundorf, Weinfelden, Wigoltingen
- Website: amlikon-bissegg.ch

Amlikon-Bissegg is a municipality in the district of Weinfelden in the canton of Thurgau in Switzerland.

The municipality was created on 1 January 1995 by a merger of Amlikon, Bissegg, Griesenberg and Strohwilen.

== History ==
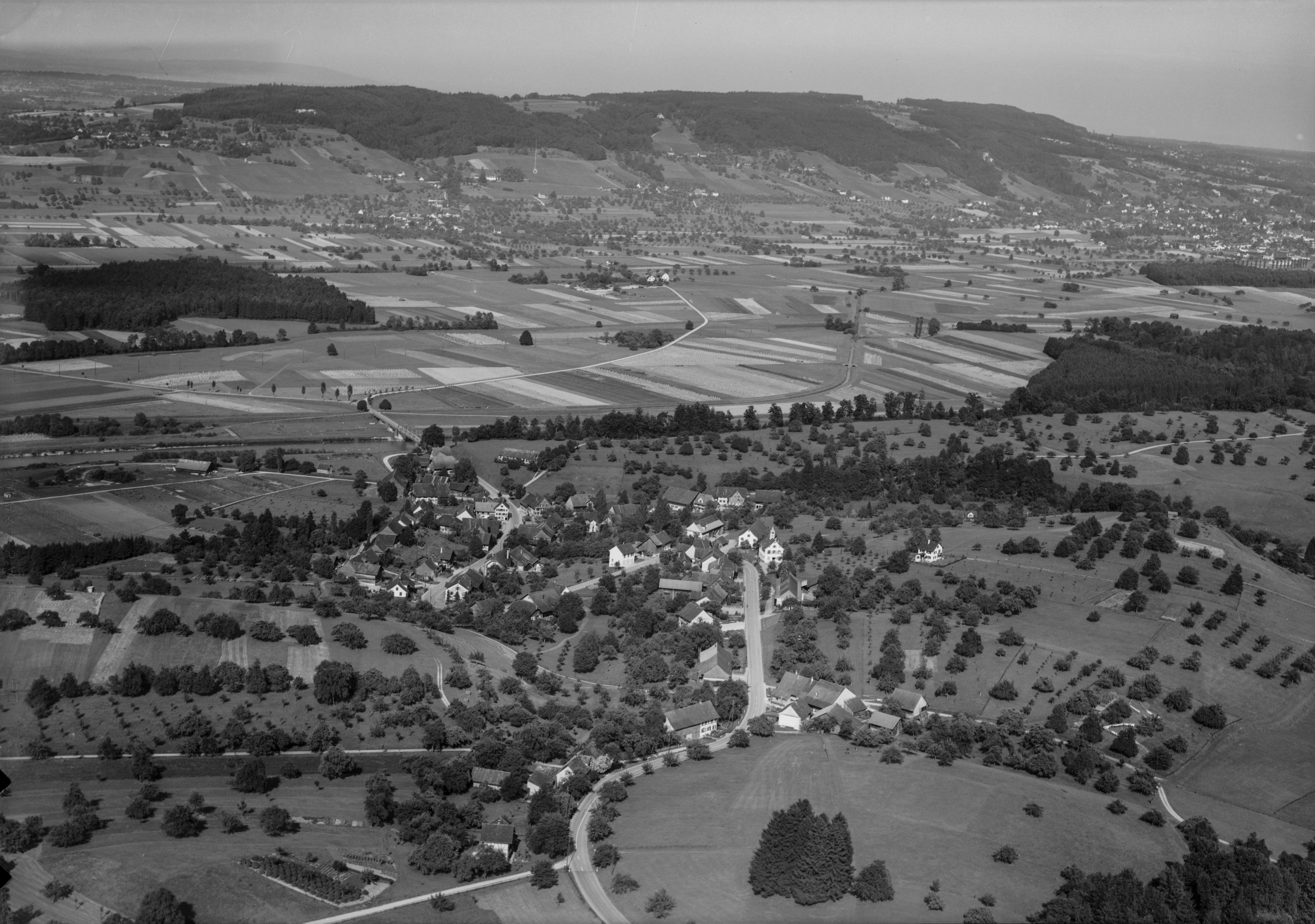
Aerial view (1954)

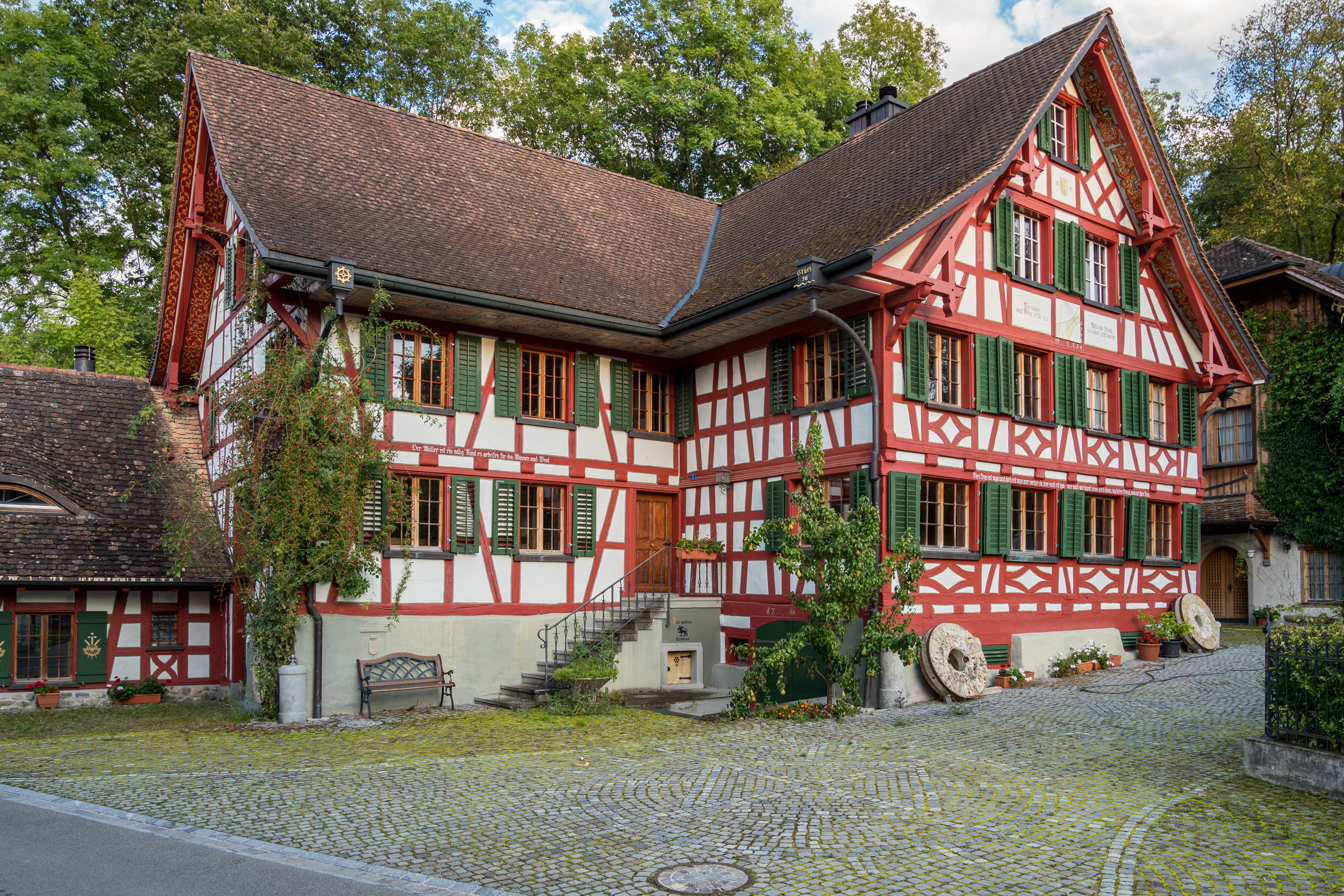
Historic watermill in Amlikon

Amlikon village is first mentioned in 1282. The hamlet of Bissegg is first mentioned in 1324 as Bynssegge. Bissegg also includes the hamlets of Holzhäusern (mentioned in 1397 as Holtzhusern), Hünikon (mentioned in 857 as Huninchova) and Junkholz (mentioned in 1324 as Junkholtz). The village of Griesenberg is first mentioned in 1256 as Griessinberc and it also includes the hamlet of Fimmelsberg (mentioned in 1228 as Vilmarsperc) as well as other hamlets.

=== Amlikon ===
During the High Middle Ages it was part of the lands of the Baron of Bussnang. From the mid-13th century until 1798, it was part of the court of Griesenberg, which came from a side line of the Bussnang family. Amlikon has always been part of the parish of Bussnang. The ferry over the Rhine in Amlikon, was first mentioned in the 14th century. It was replaced around 1727 by a bridge. The flood of 15 June 1910 destroyed the covered bridge that had been built in 1821. It was replaced in 1911–12 by an iron structure, which was replaced in 1995 by a concrete bridge. The municipality lies on both sides of the Thur River.

Until the 19th century the main economic activities were grain cultivation in a three-field system and hemp production. This was mostly replaced in the 19th century by cattle and dairy farming. The first cheese factory was built in 1908. Wine grapes are cultivated today. In the 19th century there was an oil press. The steep lane to the village was replaced in 1832 by the S-shaped village street. At the turn of the 20th century there were several local embroidery shops. However, larger factories did not permanently settle in the village.

=== Bissegg ===
Much of the village was owned by the Abbey of St. Gallen. During the High Middle Ages it was under the influence of the Baron of Bussnang. Between the mid-13th century to 1798, it was under the court of the Griesenberg family, which was a side branch of the Bussnang family. It was always part of the parish of Bussnang, until in 1857 Bissegg and Junkholz became part of the Reformed parish of Leutmerken.

The local economy was based on grain cultivation, and some vineyards until the 19th century when it transitioned to cattle and dairy farming. Starting about 1870 milk from the village went to Holzhof village in the municipality of Griesenberg. Finally, in 1905, a cheesemaker opened in Bissegg.

=== Griesenberg ===
Originally the village was owned by the Abbey of St. Gallen. During the High Middle Ages it was under the Baron of Bussnang. At the beginning of the 13th century, the west half of the Bussnang lands came under a limited self-rule. Its administrative center was the fortress of Alt-Griesenberg at Altenburg, until its destruction in 1289 by the Habsburgs. The new administrative center became the castle of Neu-Griesenberg at Tümpfel. After the death of the last of the male Griesenberg, Lütold von Griesenberg, in 1325, the new ruler was his daughter Adele. In 1367 the village had to be pledged as collateral to the Harzer brothers from Constance. Then, in 1397, Adelaide's daughter from her first marriage, Clementia, sold the village to Konrad von Hoff of Constance. In the 15th and early 16th centuries it became the property of various families until it was acquired in 1529 by Henry of Ulm, who was also a citizen of Constance. His descendants sold it in 1759 in Lucerne, who sold it again in 1793. Karl Anton Kraft, Austrian bailiff of Stockach, sold it in 1795 to the Schulthess Family of Zurich. A Gerichtsoffnung or village law of 1475 (which was updated in 1605) defined the rights of the citizens of the village. The church of Griesenberg was part of the parish of Leutmerken, and converted to the new faith during the Protestant Reformation in 1529. When Marx von Ulm converted back to the old religion in 1607, the Counter-Reformation came into the village.

Until the 19th century, the local economy was based on grain cultivation. This changed to livestock raising and then dairy farming followed by fruit cultivation. The Holzhof, which has been in the possession of the Wartmann family since 1858, is one of the cradles of Swiss Tilsit cheese.

== Geography ==
Amlikon-Bissegg has an area, as of 2009, of 14.43 square kilometers (5.57 sq mi). Of this area, 9.88 km^{2} (3.81 sq mi) or 68.5% is used for agricultural purposes, while 3.2 km^{2} (1.2 sq mi) or 22.2% is forested. Of the rest of the land, 1.18 km^{2} (0.46 sq mi) or 8.2% is settled (buildings or roads), 0.18 km^{2} (0.069 sq mi) or 1.2% is either rivers or lakes and 0.01 km^{2} (2.5 acres) or 0.1% is unproductive land.

Of the built up area, industrial buildings made up 3.1% of the total area while housing and buildings made up 0.3% and transportation infrastructure made up 0.4%. while parks, green belts and sports fields made up 4.2%. Out of the forested land, 20.4% of the total land area is heavily forested and 1.8% is covered with orchards or small clusters of trees. Of the agricultural land, 61.2% is used for growing crops, while 7.3% is used for orchards or vine crops. Of the water in the municipality, 0.2% is in lakes and 1.0% is in rivers and streams.

In 1995 the municipality was created when the Munizipalgemeinde of Amlikon merged with the Ortsgemeinden of Amlikon, Bissegg, Griesenberg and Strohwilen.

The municipality is located on the left bank of the Thur River on the Konstanz-Wil road. It consists of the villages of Amlikon, Griesenberg and Strohwilen and the hamlets of Bissegg, Holzhäusern, Hünikon, Junkholz, Altenburg, Bänikon, Fimmelsberg, Holzhof, Leutmerken and Tümpfel as well as other settlements.

== Demographics ==
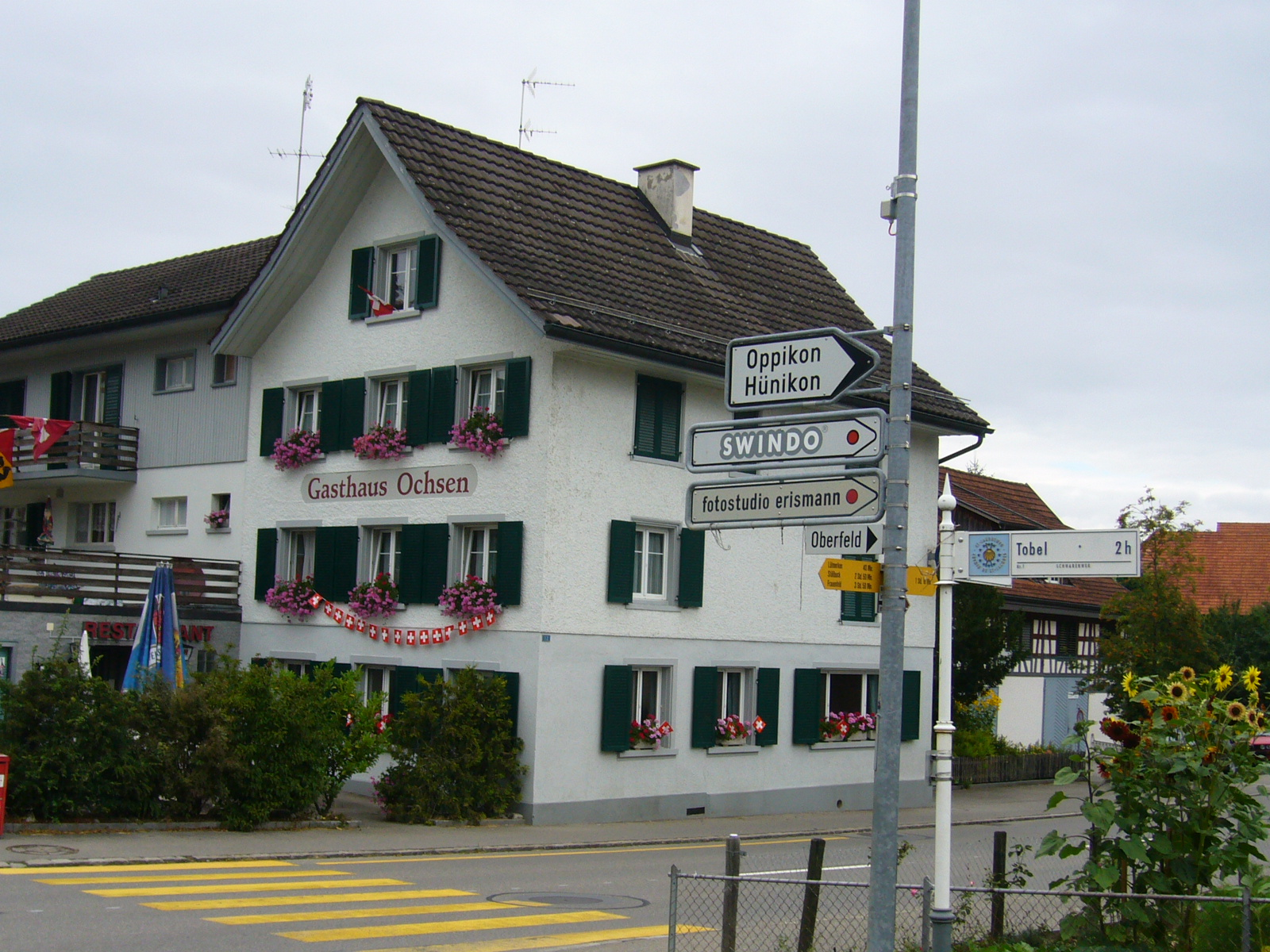
Restaurant Ochsen in Amlikon

Amlikon-Bissegg has a population (as of December 2020) of 1,332. As of 2008, 7.0% of the population are foreign nationals. Over the last 10 years (1997–2007) the population has changed at a rate of 9.5%. Most of the population (as of 2000) speaks German (97.4%), with French being second most common ( 0.5%) and Polish being third ( 0.3%).

As of 2008, the gender distribution of the population was 51.6% male and 48.4% female. The population was made up of 598 Swiss men (47.8% of the population), and 48 (3.8%) non-Swiss men. There were 566 Swiss women (45.2%), and 40 (3.2%) non-Swiss women.

In 2008 there were 11 live births to Swiss citizens and 1 birth to non-Swiss citizens, and in same time span there were 8 deaths of Swiss citizens. Ignoring immigration and emigration, the population of Swiss citizens increased by 3 while the foreign population increased by 1. There was 1 Swiss man, 5 non-Swiss men who emigrated from Switzerland to another country and 4 non-Swiss women who emigrated from Switzerland to another country. The total Swiss population change in 2008 (from all sources) was an increase of 5 and the non-Swiss population change was an increase of 19 people. This represents a population growth rate of 2.0%.

The age distribution, as of 2009, in Amlikon-Bissegg is; 126 children or 9.7% of the population are between 0 and 9 years old and 218 teenagers or 16.8% are between 10 and 19. Of the adult population, 124 people or 9.6% of the population are between 20 and 29 years old. 161 people or 12.4% are between 30 and 39, 237 people or 18.3% are between 40 and 49, and 195 people or 15.0% are between 50 and 59. The senior population distribution is 107 people or 8.2% of the population are between 60 and 69 years old, 79 people or 6.1% are between 70 and 79, there are 46 people or 3.5% who are between 80 and 89, and there are 5 people or 0.4% who are 90 and older.

As of 2000, there were 412 private households in the municipality, and an average of 2.9 persons per household. In 2000 there were 202 single family homes (or 88.6% of the total) out of a total of 228 inhabited buildings. There were 18 two family buildings (7.9%), 6 three family buildings (2.6%) and 2 multi-family buildings (or .9%). There were 288 (or 24.0%) persons who were part of a couple without children, and 741 (or 61.8%) who were part of a couple with children. There were 38 (or 3.2%) people who lived in single parent home, while there are 16 persons who were adult children living with one or both parents, 6 persons who lived in a household made up of relatives, 11 who lived in a household made up of unrelated persons, and 23 who are either institutionalized or live in another type of collective housing.

The vacancy rate for the municipality, in 2008, was 2.06%. As of 2007, the construction rate of new housing units was 9.8 new units per 1000 residents. In 2000 there were 443 apartments in the municipality. The most common apartment size was the 6 room apartment of which there were 152. There were 4 single room apartments and 152 apartments with six or more rooms.

In the 2007 federal election the most popular party was the SVP which received 57.87% of the vote. The next three most popular parties were the CVP (10.66%), the Green Party (9.48%) and the FDP (8.74%). In the federal election, a total of 457 votes were cast, and the voter turnout was 50.7%.

The historical population is given in the following table:

Year	Population Amlikon	Population Bissegg	Population Griesenberg
1850	278	–	500
1870	–	205	–
1900	303	187	438
1920	–	138	–
1950	–	153	397
1960	258	161	–
1990	352	185	352
Year	Population, Amlikon-Bissegg		
2000	1,199		

== Sights ==
The entire hamlet of Leutmerken and the Griesenberg are designated as part of the Inventory of Swiss Heritage Sites.

== Economy ==
As of 2007, Amlikon-Bissegg had an unemployment rate of 1.24%. As of 2005, there were 196 people employed in the primary economic sector and about 72 businesses involved in this sector. 73 people are employed in the secondary sector and there are 14 businesses in this sector. 150 people are employed in the tertiary sector, with 40 businesses in this sector.

In 2000 there were 809 workers who lived in the municipality. Of these, 356 or about 44.0% of the residents worked outside Amlikon-Bissegg while 114 people commuted into the municipality for work. There were a total of 567 jobs (of at least 6 hours per week) in the municipality. Of the working population, 5.9% used public transportation to get to work, and 49% used a private car.

== Religion ==
From the 2000 census, 349 or 29.1% were Roman Catholic, while 654 or 54.5% belonged to the Swiss Reformed Church. Of the rest of the population, there was 1 Old Catholic who belonged to the Christian Catholic Church of Switzerland there are 3 individuals (or about 0.25% of the population) who belong to the Orthodox Church, and there are 62 individuals (or about 5.17% of the population) who belong to another Christian church. There were 3 (or about 0.25% of the population) who are Islamic. There are 11 individuals (or about 0.92% of the population) who belong to another church (not listed on the census), 85 (or about 7.09% of the population) belong to no church, are agnostic or atheist, and 31 individuals (or about 2.59% of the population) did not answer the question.

== Education ==
In Amlikon-Bissegg about 72.5% of the population (between age 25 and 64) have completed either non-mandatory upper secondary education or additional higher education (either university or a Fachhochschule).

Amlikon-Bissegg is home to the Amlikon primary school district. In the 2008/2009 school year there were 58 students. There were 10 children in the kindergarten, and the average class size was 10 kindergartners. Of the children in kindergarten, 5 or 50.0% were female, 1 or 10.0% were not Swiss citizens and 1 or 10.0% did not speak German natively. The lower and upper primary levels begin at about age 5-6 and last for 6 years. There were 31 children in who were at the lower primary level and 17 children in the upper primary level. The average class size in the primary school was 16 students. At the lower primary level, there were 21 children or 67.7% of the total population who were female, 3 or 9.7% were not Swiss citizens and 2 or 6.5% did not speak German natively. In the upper primary level, there were 11 or 64.7% who were female, .
