= Strohwilen =

Village in Thurgau, Switzerland

Coordinates: 47°33′8″N 9°0′56″E

Strohwilen is a village and former municipality in the canton of Thurgau, Switzerland.

In 1995 the municipality was merged with the other, neighboring municipalities Amlikon, Bissegg and Griesenberg to form a new and larger municipality Amlikon-Bissegg.
