= Junkholz =

- Village
- Location in Switzerland
- Coordinates: 47°33′47″N 9°2′50″E
- Country: Switzerland
- Canton: Canton of Thurgau
- Municipality: Amlikon-Bissegg
- First recorded: 1324 (as Junkholtz)

Junkholz is a village in the canton of Thurgau, Switzerland.

It was first recorded in year 1324 as Junkholtz.

Junkholz is located in the former municipality Bissegg. In 1995 Bissegg municipality merged with its neighbor to form a new and larger municipality Amlikon-Bissegg.
