= Hünikon, Thurgau =

Coordinates: 47°33′37″N 9°3′44″E

Hünikon is a village in the canton of Thurgau, Switzerland.

It was first recorded in year 857 as Huninchova.

Hünikon is in the former municipality Bissegg. In 1995 Bissegg municipality merged with its neighbor to form a new and larger municipality Amlikon-Bissegg.
