= Hüttlingen, Switzerland =

Hüttlingen
- Municipality
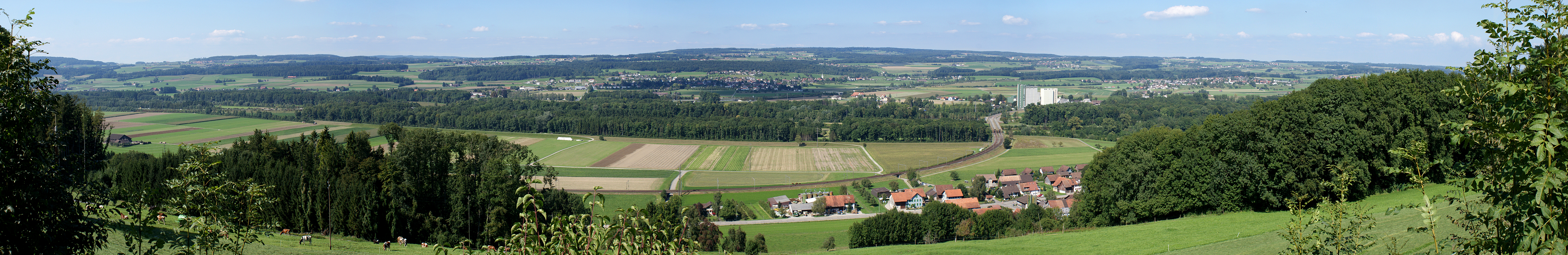

- Coat of arms
- Location of Hüttlingen
- Location within Switzerland Location within Canton of Thurgau
- Coordinates: 47°35′N 8°59′E
- Country: Switzerland
- Canton: Thurgau
- District: Frauenfeld

Area
  - Total: 11.6 km^{2} (4.5 sq mi)
- Elevation: 411 m (1,348 ft)

Population (December 2007)
  - Total: 837
  - Density: 72.2/km^{2} (187/sq mi)
- Time zone: UTC+01:00 (CET)
  - Summer (DST): UTC+02:00 (CEST)
- Postal code: 8553
- SFOS number: 4590
- ISO 3166 code: CH-TG
- Surrounded by: Amlikon-Bissegg, Felben-Wellhausen, Müllheim, Pfyn, Thundorf, Wigoltingen
- Website: www.huettlingen.ch

Hüttlingen (German pronunciation: [ˈhʏtlɪŋən]) is a municipality in the district of Frauenfeld, in the canton of Thurgau in Switzerland.

== History ==
Hüttlingen is first mentioned in 1336 as Hutlingen. During the Early Middle Ages Hüttlingen was a fief of Reichenau. Starting in 1360 it belonged to the lords of Wellenberg. The low court rights for Hüttlingen were separated from the rights of the Wellenbergs in 1608. In 1674, Johann Kaspar Escher acquired rights to the village and Hüttlingen Castle. Between 1694 and 1798 it was owned by the city of Zurich, which allowed the low court to be run out of the castle by their chief bailiff.

Hüttlingen was originally in the parish of Pfyn, and later in the Müllheim parish. The chapel of St. Andrew is first mentioned in 1337. The parish was created in 1484, and the Reformed parish joined Eschikofen, Harenwilen and Mettendorf in 1531.

The main economic activity in the village has always been agriculture. In the 19th century, in addition to the traditional fruit and grain production, dairy farming and cattle raising began in the village. During the 20th century, some viticulture operations began, though they were later abandoned. Although agriculture has become less common, in 2000 about one third of jobs in the village were in farming.

== Geography ==
Hüttlingen has an area, as of 2009, of 11.6 square kilometers (4.5 sq mi). Of this area, 5.93 km^{2} (2.29 sq mi) or 51.1% is used for agricultural purposes, while 4.67 km^{2} (1.80 sq mi) or 40.3% is forested. Of the rest of the land, 0.78 km^{2} (0.30 sq mi) or 6.7% is settled (buildings or roads), 0.21 km^{2} (0.081 sq mi) or 1.8% is either rivers or lakes.

Of the built up area, industrial buildings made up 2.4% of the total area while housing and buildings made up 0.2% and transportation infrastructure made up 0.1%. while parks, green belts and sports fields made up 4.0%. Out of the forested land, 38.4% of the total land area is heavily forested and 1.8% is covered with orchards or small clusters of trees. Of the agricultural land, 47.2% is used for growing crops, while 3.9% is used for orchards or vine crops. All the water in the municipality is flowing water.

The municipality is located in the Frauenfeld district, at the northern foot of Wellenberg mountain. It consists of the village of Hüttlingen and the communities of Eschikofen, Harenwilen and Mettendorf.

== Demographics ==
Hüttlingen has a population (as of December 2020) of 829. As of 2008, 6.6% of the population are foreign nationals. Over the last 10 years (1997–2007) the population has changed at a rate of -1.5%. Most of the population (as of 2000) speaks German (95.0%), with Albanian being second most common ( 2.0%) and French being third ( 0.8%).

As of 2008, the gender distribution of the population was 51.5% male and 48.5% female. The population was made up of 400 Swiss men (47.4% of the population), and 34 (4.0%) non-Swiss men. There were 387 Swiss women (45.9%), and 22 (2.6%) non-Swiss women.

In 2008 there were 3 live births to Swiss citizens and births to non-Swiss citizens, and in same time span there were 3 deaths of Swiss citizens. Ignoring immigration and emigration, the population of Swiss citizens remained the same while the foreign population remained the same. There was 1 Swiss man, 1 Swiss woman who emigrated from Switzerland to another countryand 1 non-Swiss man who emigrated from Switzerland to another country. The total Swiss population change in 2008 (from all sources) was an increase of 9 and the non-Swiss population change was a decrease of 4 people. This represents a population growth rate of 0.6%.

The age distribution, as of 2009, in Hüttlingen is; 77 children or 9.3% of the population are between 0 and 9 years old and 129 teenagers or 15.6% are between 10 and 19. Of the adult population, 105 people or 12.7% of the population are between 20 and 29 years old. 101 people or 12.2% are between 30 and 39, 137 people or 16.5% are between 40 and 49, and 136 people or 16.4% are between 50 and 59. The senior population distribution is 82 people or 9.9% of the population are between 60 and 69 years old, 43 people or 5.2% are between 70 and 79, there are 17 people or 2.1% who are between 80 and 89, and there are 2 people or 0.2% who are 90 and older.

As of 2000, there were 309 private households in the municipality, and an average of 2.7 persons per household. In 2000 there were 145 single family homes (or 87.9% of the total) out of a total of 165 inhabited buildings. There were 13 two family buildings (7.9%), 2 three family buildings (1.2%) and 5 multi-family buildings (or 3.0%). There were 171 (or 20.4%) persons who were part of a couple without children, and 516 (or 61.5%) who were part of a couple with children. There were 49 (or 5.8%) people who lived in single parent home, while there are 5 persons who were adult children living with one or both parents, 8 who lived in a household made up of unrelated persons, and 13 who are either institutionalized or live in another type of collective housing.

The vacancy rate for the municipality, in 2008, was 0.31%. As of 2007, the construction rate of new housing units was 6 new units per 1000 residents. In 2000 there were 301 apartments in the municipality. The most common apartment size was the 5 room apartment of which there were 96. There were 2 single room apartments and 69 apartments with six or more rooms. As of 2000 the average price to rent an average apartment in Hüttlingen was 1221.58 Swiss francs (CHF) per month (US$980, £550, €780 approx. exchange rate from 2000). The average rate for a one-room apartment was 450.00 CHF (US$360, £200, €290), a two-room apartment was about 741.25 CHF (US$590, £330, €470), a three-room apartment was about 1188.00 CHF (US$950, £530, €760) and a six or more room apartment cost an average of 1491.67 CHF (US$1190, £670, €950). The average apartment price in Hüttlingen was 109.5% of the national average of 1116 CHF.

In the 2007 federal election the most popular party was the SVP which received 51.82% of the vote. The next three most popular parties were the SP (13.94%), the Green Party (10.3%) and the CVP (9.14%). In the federal election, a total of 336 votes were cast, and the voter turnout was 56.2%.

The historical population is given in the following table:

year	population
1850	724
1900	622
1950	684
1990	646
2000	839

== Sights ==
The entire village of Hüttlingen is designated as part of the Inventory of Swiss Heritage Sites.

== Economy ==
As of 2007, Hüttlingen had an unemployment rate of 0.93%. As of 2005, there were 95 people employed in the primary economic sector and about 33 businesses involved in this sector. 37 people are employed in the secondary sector and there are 5 businesses in this sector. 53 people are employed in the tertiary sector, with 15 businesses in this sector.

In 2000 there were 623 workers who lived in the municipality. Of these, 354 or about 56.8% of the residents worked outside Hüttlingen while 55 people commuted into the municipality for work. There were a total of 324 jobs (of at least 6 hours per week) in the municipality. Of the working population, 13.3% used public transportation to get to work, and 51.1% used a private car.

== Religion ==
From the 2000 census, 148 or 17.6% were Roman Catholic, while 496 or 59.1% belonged to the Swiss Reformed Church. Of the rest of the population, there were 4 Old Catholics (or about 0.48% of the population) who belonged to the Christian Catholic Church of Switzerland, and there are 44 individuals (or about 5.24% of the population) who belong to another Christian church. There were 3 individuals (or about 0.36% of the population) who were Jewish, and 25 (or about 2.98% of the population) who are Islamic. There are 2 individuals (or about 0.24% of the population) who belong to another church (not listed on the census), 72 (or about 8.58% of the population) belong to no church, are agnostic or atheist, and 45 individuals (or about 5.36% of the population) did not answer the question.

== Education ==
In Hüttlingen about 74.6% of the population (between age 25 and 64) have completed either non-mandatory upper secondary education or additional higher education (either university or a Fachhochschule).

Hüttlingen is home to the Hüttlingen primary school district. In the 2008/2009 school year there are 88 students. There are 20 children in the kindergarten, and the average class size is 20 kindergartners. Of the children in kindergarten, 11 or 55.0% are female, 3 or 15.0% are not Swiss citizens and 2 or 10.0% do not speak German natively. The lower and upper primary levels begin at about age 5-6 and lasts for 6 years. There are 35 children in who are at the lower primary level and 33 children in the upper primary level. The average class size in the primary school is 22.67 students. At the lower primary level, there are 19 children or 54.3% of the total population who are female, 5 or 14.3% are not Swiss citizens and 5 or 14.3% do not speak German natively. In the upper primary level, there are 19 or 57.6% who are female, 2 or 6.1% are not Swiss citizens and 2 or 6.1% do not speak German natively.

== Transport ==
Hüttlingen-Mettendorf railway station is a stop of the Zürich S-Bahn on services S8 and S30.
