= Griesenberg =

Hamlet in the canton of Thurgau in Switzerland

Coordinates: 47°34′8″N 9°0′42″E

Griesenberg is a village located in the canton of Thurgau, Switzerland.

== History ==
In 1995, the municipality was merged with other neighboring municipalities including Amlikon, Bissegg and Strohwilen to form a new and larger municipality called Amlikon-Bissegg.

First records about this area were found in year 1256 at Griessinberc.

Originally, the village was owned by the Abbey of St. Gallen. During the High Middle Ages, it was under the Baron of Bussnang. At the beginning of the 13th Century, the west half of the Bussnang lands came under a limited self-rule. Its administrative center was the fortress of Alt-Griesenberg at Altenburg, until its destruction in 1289 by the Habsburgs. The new administrative center became the castle of Neu-Griesenberg at Tümpfel. After the death of the last of the male Griesenberg, Lütold von Griesenberg, in 1325, the new ruler was his daughter Adele.

In 1367, the village was pledged as a collateral to the Harzer brothers from Constance. Then, in 1397, Adelaide's daughter from her first marriage, Clementia, sold the village to Konrad von Hoff of Constance. In the 15th and early 16th Centuries, it became a property transferred to various families until it was acquired in 1529 by Henry of Ulm, who was also a citizen of Constance. Henry’s descendants sold it in 1759 to Lucerne, who sold it again in 1793. Karl Anton Kraft, Austrian bailiff of Stockach, sold it in 1795 to the Schulthess Family of Zurich.

In 1475, a Gerichtsoffnung, commonly known as a village law, (which was updated in 1605) defined the rights of the citizens of the village. The church of Griesenberg was part of the parish of Leutmerken, and converted to the new faith during the Protestant Reformation in 1529. When Marx von Ulm converted back to the old religion in 1607, the Counter-Reformation came into the village.

Until the 19th Century, the local economy was based on grain cultivation. After some time, their livelihood changed to livestock raising, dairy farming and followed by fruit cultivation. The Holzhof, which has been in the possession of the Wartmann family since 1858, is one of the cradles of Swiss Tilsit cheese.

== Historic Population ==
The municipality also contained the villages Altenburg, Bänikon, Fimmelsberg, Holzhof, Leutmerken and Tümpfel. It had 500 inhabitants in 1850, which decreased to 438 in 1900, 397 in 1950 and 352 in 1990.
