= Frauenfeld (disambiguation) =

Frauenfeld can be:

in Switzerland

- Frauenfeld, city in Switzerland
- Frauenfeld District, a district in Switzerland
- FC Frauenfeld, a Swiss football team
- Buch bei Frauenfeld, a village in Switzerland

people

- Alfred Frauenfeld, Alfred Eduard Frauenfeld (1898-1977), an Austrian Nazi leader
- Georg Ritter von Frauenfeld (1807-1873), an Austrian naturalist
