= Wilen bei Neunforn =

Village in Thurgau, Switzerland

- Former municipality
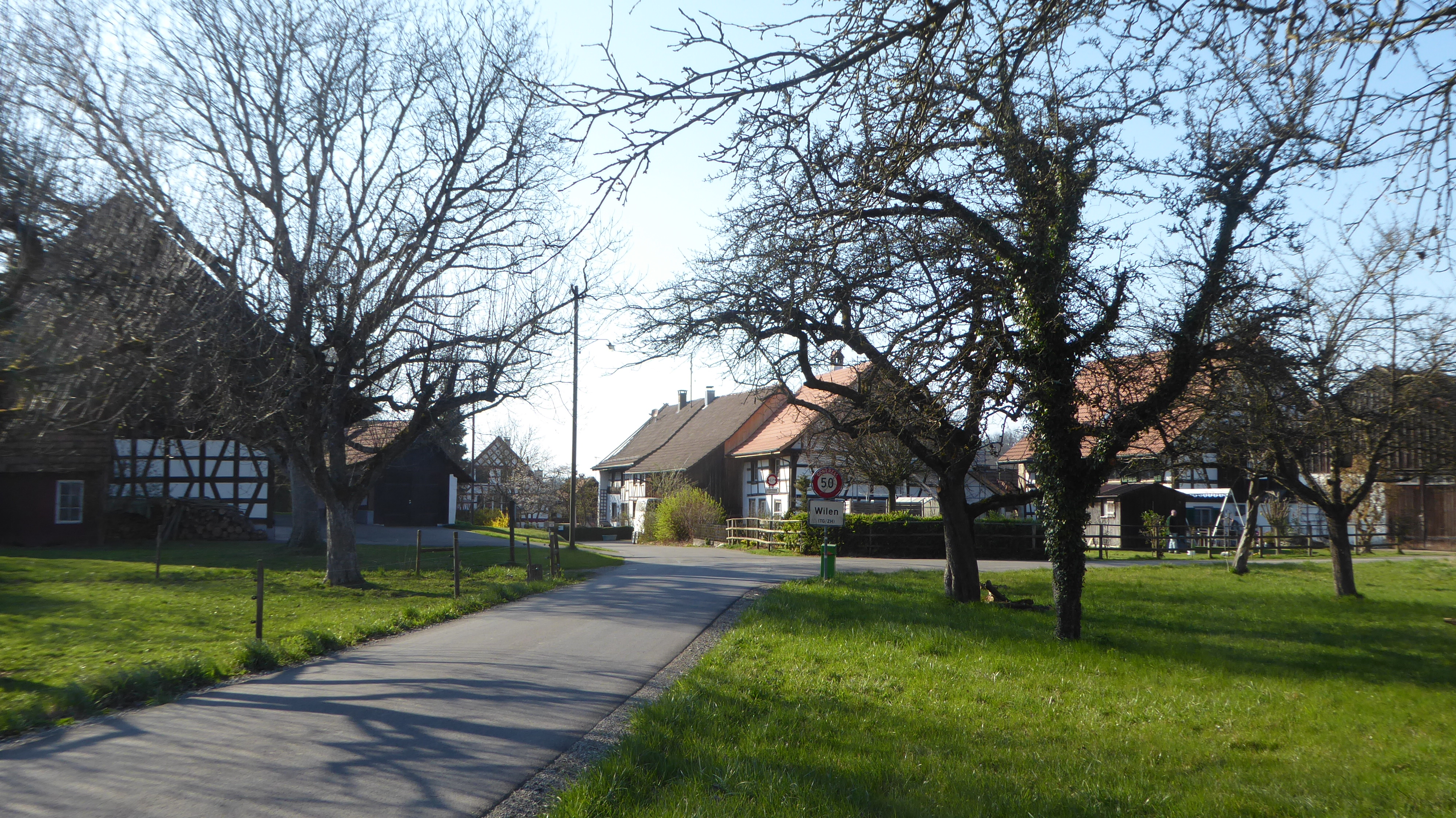
- Wilen bei Neunforn from the east
- Location of Wilen bei Neunforn
- Location within Switzerland Location within Canton of Thurgau
- Coordinates: 47.6039°N 8.7985°E
- Country: Switzerland
- Canton: Thurgau
- District: Frauenfeld
- Municipality: Neunforn

Population (1990)
  - Total: 53
- Time zone: UTC+01:00 (CET)
  - Summer (DST): UTC+02:00 (CEST)
- SFOS number: 4598
- ISO 3166 code: CH-TG
- Website

Wilen bei Neunforn is a former Ortsgemeinde (local commune) in the district of Frauenfeld in the canton of Thurgau, Switzerland, which has been part of the municipality of Neunforn since 1996. The village is divided by the cantonal border: its Zurich part belonged to Oberstammheim from 1798 to 2018 and has belonged to Stammheim since 2019.

== History ==
Wilen bei Neunforn is first mentioned in 909 as Wilare. In that year the Abbey of Saint Gall acquired two hides (Huben) in Wilen through an exchange, and the nearby monasteries of St. Katharinental and Kalchrain also owned farms there. Wilen was divided among the three low courts of Niederneunforn, Oberneunforn and Stammheim, all of which were under the rule of Zurich from 1694 to 1798.

From 1803 to 1853 the Thurgau part of Wilen belonged to the Ortsgemeinde of Niederneunforn in what was then the Munizipalgemeinde (municipal commune) of Neunforn. From 1853 to 1886 (with Hueb from 1862) the whole village formed a Zivilgemeinde (civil community) under a treaty between Thurgau and Zurich, but it remained divided between Oberstammheim and Neunforn. From 1887 to 1995 the Thurgau part was an Ortsgemeinde of its own within the Munizipalgemeinde of Neunforn. In church matters all of Wilen has always belonged to Neunforn. Arable farming and livestock and dairy farming predominate in the local economy.

Wilen bei Neunforn had 78 inhabitants in 1850, 78 in 1900, 62 in 1950 and 53 in 1990.

== Bibliography ==
- Thurgauer Tagblatt, 25 July 1992
- Thurgauer Zeitung, 2 April 2007
