= Niederneunforn =

Village in Thurgau, Switzerland

- Former municipality
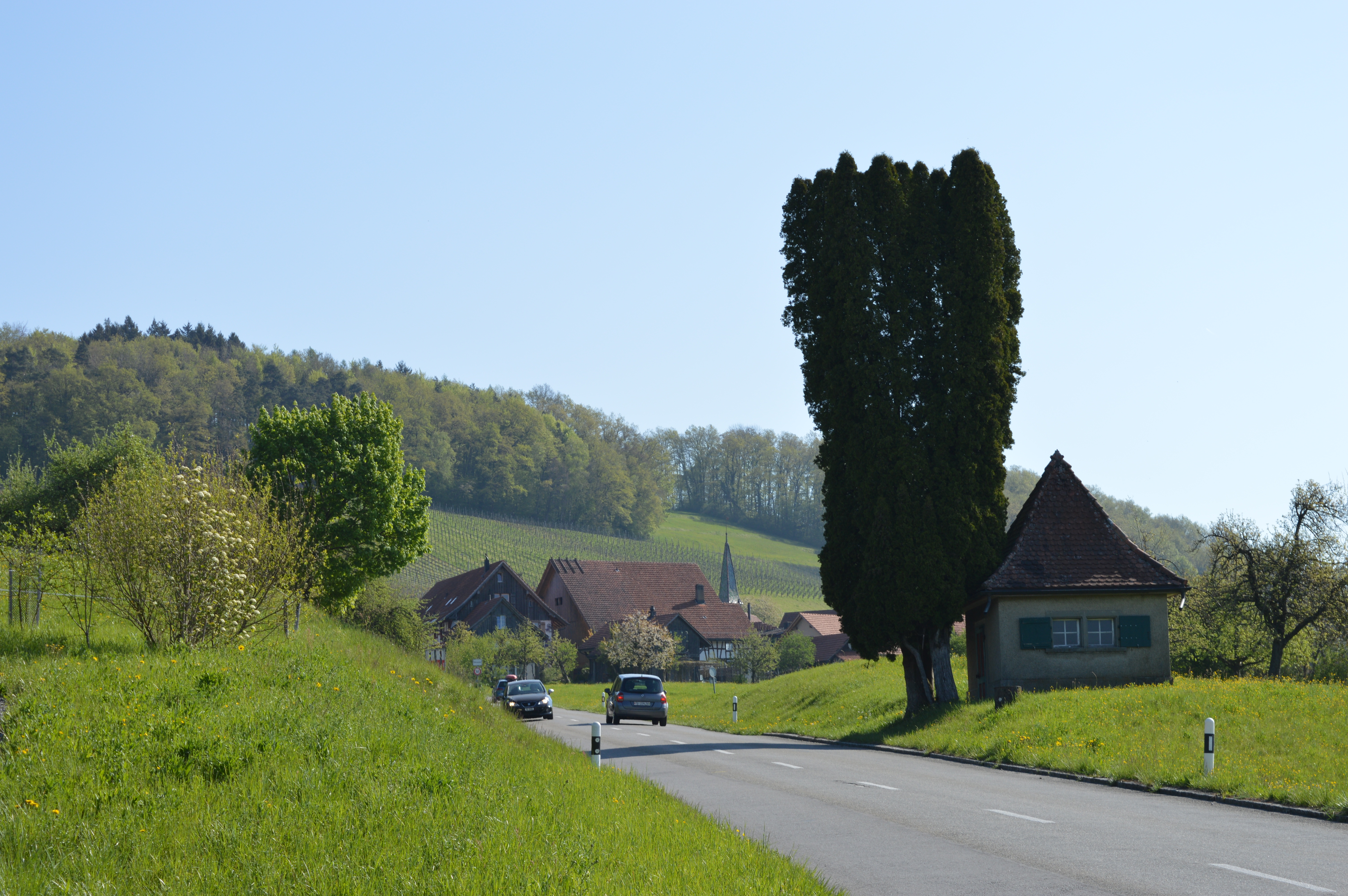
- Location of Niederneunforn
- Location within Switzerland Location within Canton of Thurgau
- Coordinates: 47.5977°N 8.7811°E
- Country: Switzerland
- Canton: Thurgau
- District: Frauenfeld
- Municipality: Neunforn

Population (1990)
  - Total: 239
- Time zone: UTC+01:00 (CET)
  - Summer (DST): UTC+02:00 (CEST)
- ISO 3166 code: CH-TG
- Website

Niederneunforn is a former Ortsgemeinde (local commune) in the canton of Thurgau, Switzerland, now part of the municipality of Neunforn in the district of Frauenfeld. The wine-growing village lies on the slopes towards the valley of the Thur. From 1803 to 1995 it was an Ortsgemeinde of the Munizipalgemeinde (municipal commune) of Neunforn, until 1853 together with Wilen bei Neunforn.

== History ==
Niederneunforn is first mentioned in 1276 as Nidern Niuvron. The low jurisdiction over Niederneunforn and one fifth of Wilen belonged to the monastery of Ittingen until 1501; it was then acquired by the Hünegg family and soon afterwards by the Leuenberg family. An Offnung (record of customary law) was written down in 1501. Until 1798 (except from 1680 to 1688) Niederneunforn had the same lords of the court (Gerichtsherren) as Oberneunforn, but it kept its own judges. Niederneunforn always belonged to the parish of Neunforn. Arable farming, fruit growing and especially viticulture, as well as livestock farming, shaped the village.

Niederneunforn had 414 inhabitants in 1850, 233 in 1900, 209 in 1950 and 239 in 1990.

== Bibliography ==
- Nüfere, 1–, 2003–
- Albert Knoepfli, Der Bezirk Frauenfeld, 1950, pp. 318–320 (Die Kunstdenkmäler des Kantons Thurgau, 1)

=== Archives ===
- Thurgauische Kantonsbibliothek, Frauenfeld: Weinrechnungs-Buch
