= Fahrhof =

Hamlet in Thurgau, Switzerland

- Former municipality
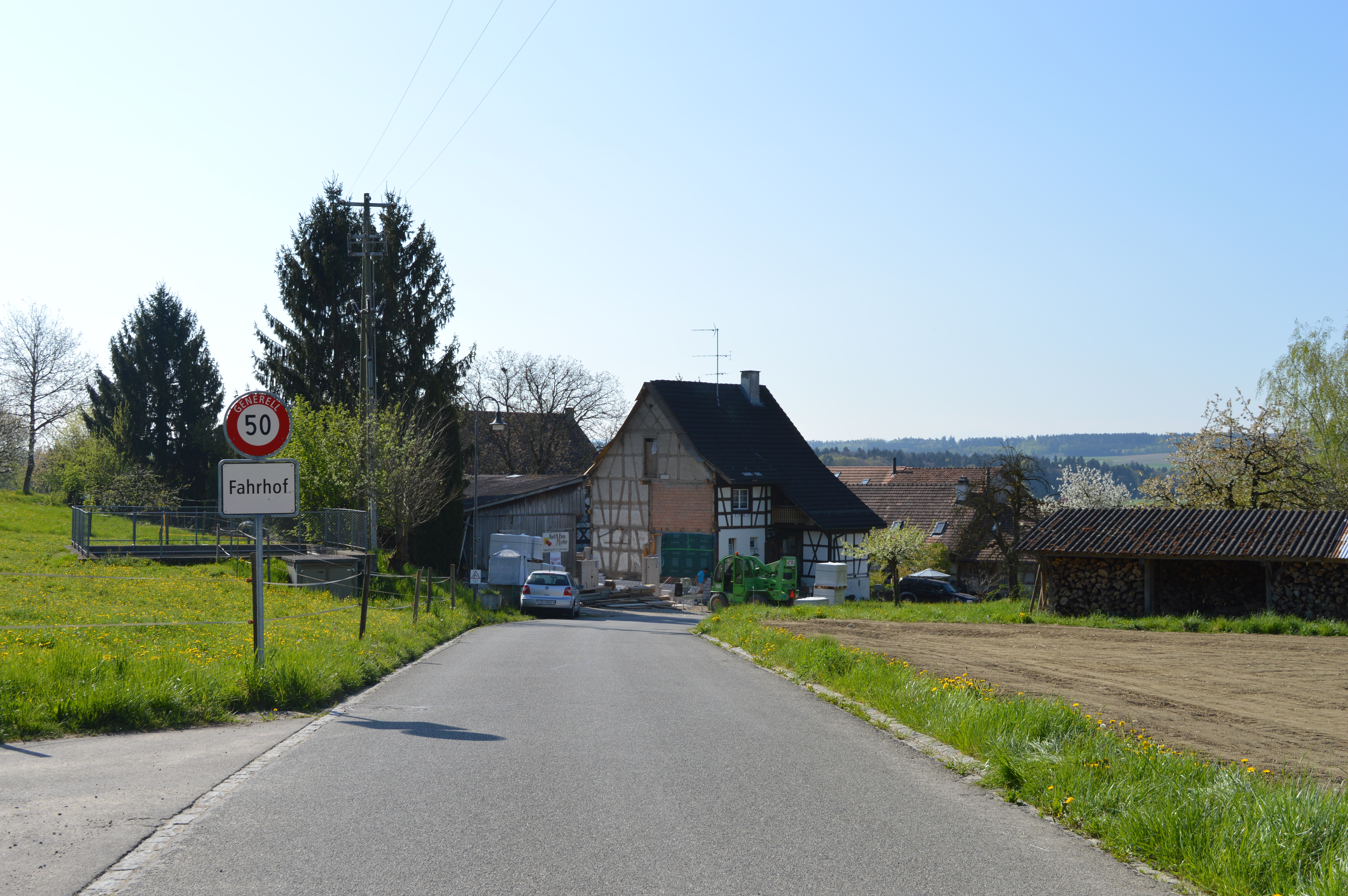
- Location of Fahrhof
- Location within Switzerland Location within Canton of Thurgau
- Coordinates: 47.5978°N 8.7568°E
- Country: Switzerland
- Canton: Thurgau
- District: Frauenfeld
- Municipality: Neunforn

Population (1860)
  - Total: 61
- Time zone: UTC+01:00 (CET)
  - Summer (DST): UTC+02:00 (CEST)
- ISO 3166 code: CH-TG
- Website

Fahrhof is a hamlet and former Ortsgemeinde (local commune) in the canton of Thurgau, Switzerland, now part of the municipality of Neunforn in the district of Frauenfeld. It lies between Ossingen and Niederneunforn, not far from the cantonal border and the Thur. From 1843 to 1869 Fahrhof was an Ortsgemeinde of its own; before and after that it belonged to the former Ortsgemeinde of Oberneunforn, which became part of the political municipality of Neunforn in 1996.

== History ==
Fahrhof is first mentioned in 1254 as Vare. In that year Töss Monastery acquired land and rights in Fahrhof. From the late Middle Ages until 1798 the settlement was part of the low court of Oberneunforn. Fahrhof, mainly Reformed since the Reformation (1525), always belonged to the parish of Neunforn. Until 1776/1779 it ran a joint school with the neighboring hamlet of Burghof in the canton of Zurich.

In the 19th century farming shifted to dairy and livestock farming and fruit growing. Viticulture, abandoned in the 19th century, has regained importance in the settlement, which has kept its farming character to this day.

Fahrhof had 55 inhabitants in 1850 and 61 in 1860.

== Bibliography ==
- Hinweisinventar alter Bauten und Ortsbilder im Kanton Thurgau, manuscript, 1997 (Staatsarchiv Thurgau)
