= Iselisberg =

- Village
- Location in Switzerland
- Coordinates: 47°35′11″N 8°49′36″E
- Country: Switzerland
- Canton: Canton of Thurgau
- Municipality: Uesslingen-Buch

Iselisberg is a village in the canton of Thurgau, Switzerland.

It is located just north of Uesslingen. In 1995, the Uesslingen municipality merged with its neighbor to form a new and larger municipality Uesslingen-Buch.

It used to be a centre of wine production.
