= Uesslingen-Buch =

- Municipality
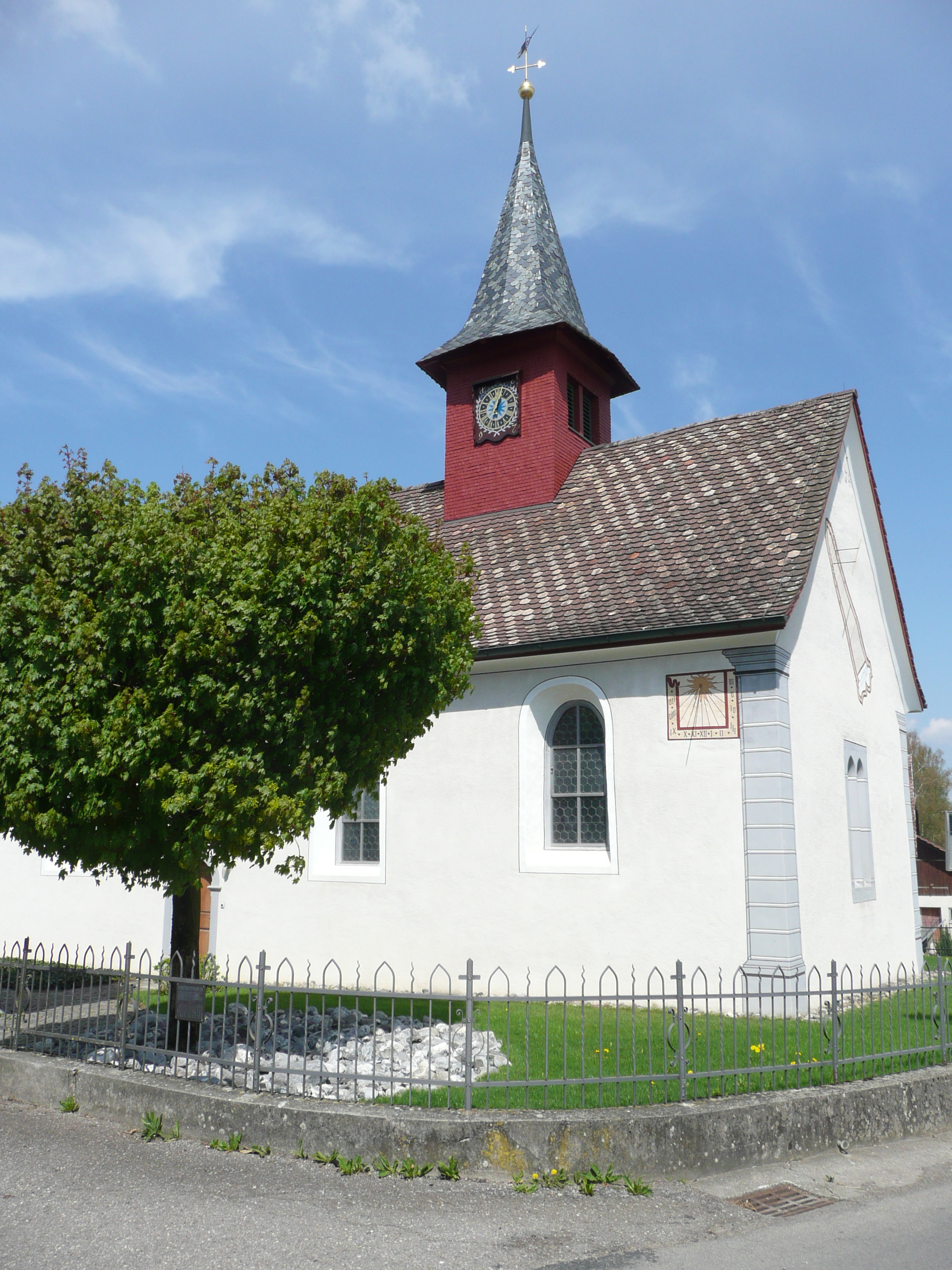

- Coat of arms
- Location of Uesslingen-Buch
- Location within Switzerland Location within Canton of Thurgau
- Coordinates: 47°35′N 8°49′E
- Country: Switzerland
- Canton: Thurgau
- District: Frauenfeld

Area
  - Total: 14 km^{2} (5.4 sq mi)
- Elevation: 465 m (1,526 ft)

Population (December 2007)
  - Total: 1,046
  - Density: 75/km^{2} (190/sq mi)
- Time zone: UTC+01:00 (CET)
  - Summer (DST): UTC+02:00 (CEST)
- Postal code: 8524
- SFOS number: 4616
- ISO 3166 code: CH-TG
- Localities: Berlingerhof, Buch bei Frauenfeld, Dietingen, Iselisberg, Trüttlikon, Uesslingen, Vorderhorben, Hinterhorben, Wyden
- Surrounded by: Altikon (ZH), Ellikon an der Thur (ZH), Frauenfeld, Hüttwilen, Neunforn, Warth-Weiningen
- Website: www.uesslingen-buch.ch

Uesslingen-Buch is a municipality in the district of Frauenfeld in the canton of Thurgau in Switzerland.

It was formed in 1995 from the union of the municipalities of Uesslingen and Buch bei Frauenfeld.

== Geography ==
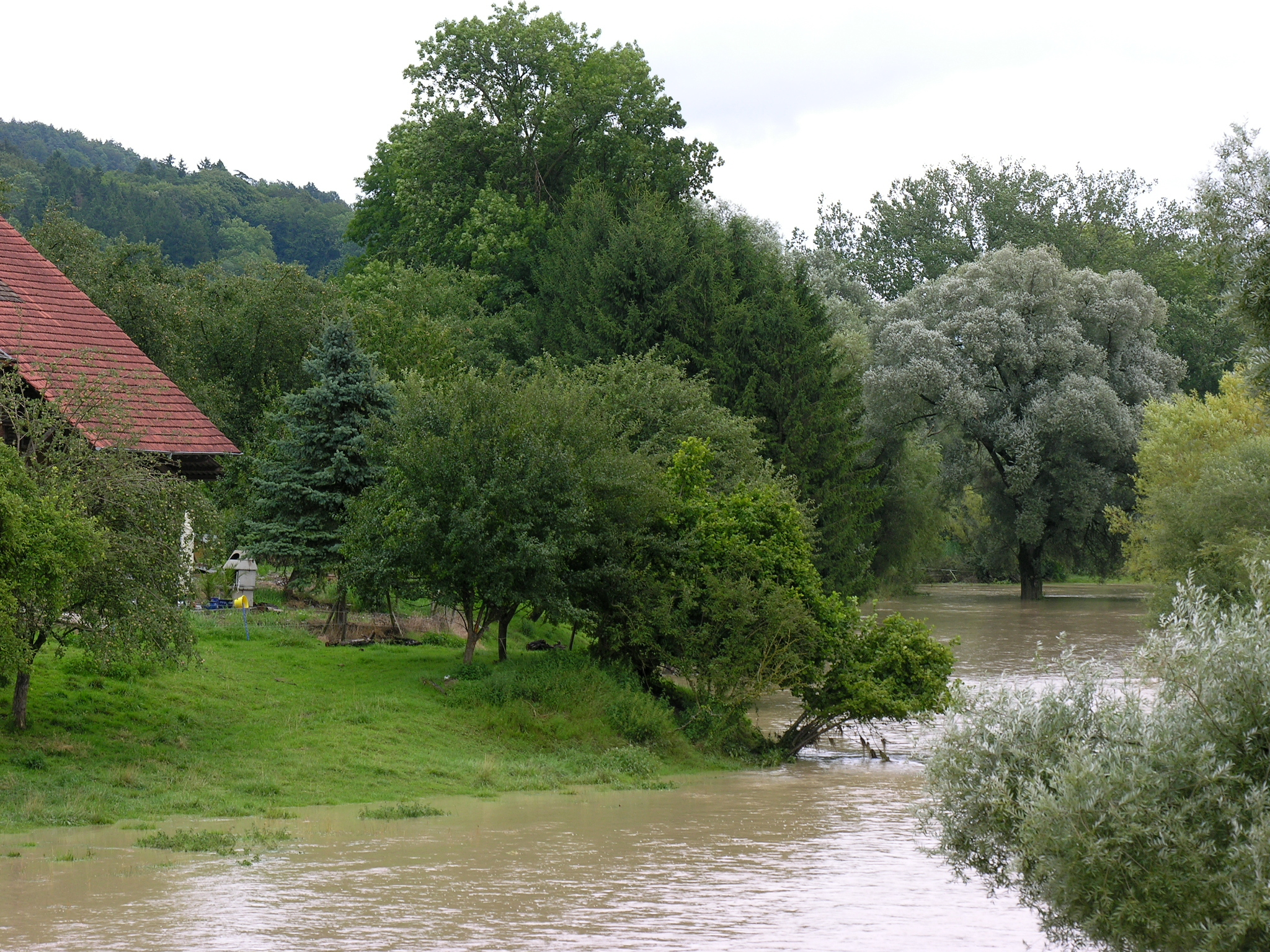
Thur river flooding in Uesslingen-Buch in 2009

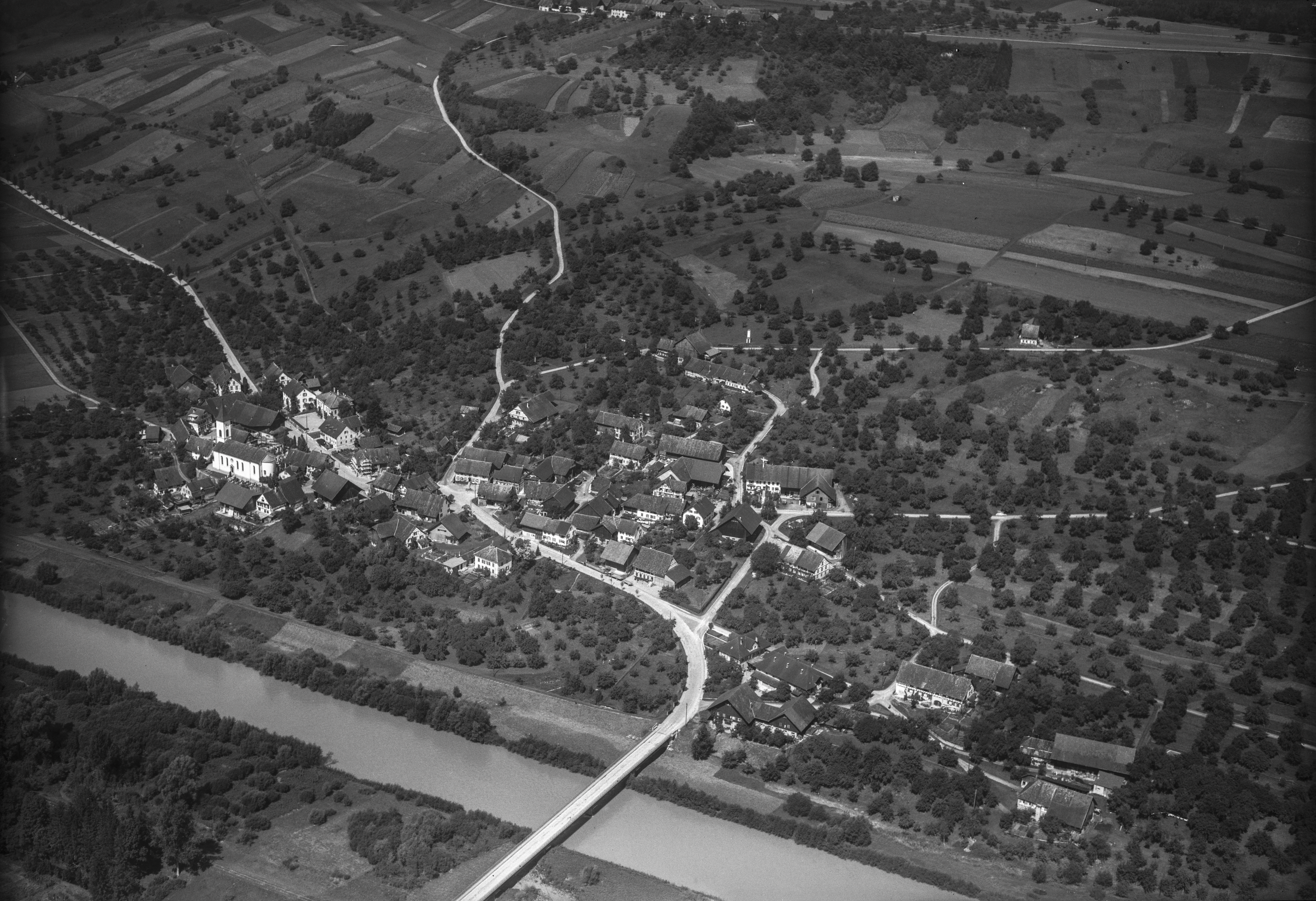
Aerial view (1948)

Uesslingen-Buch has an area, as of 2009, of 14.01 square kilometers (5.41 sq mi). Of this area, 10.58 km^{2} (4.08 sq mi) or 75.5% is used for agricultural purposes, while 1.93 km^{2} (0.75 sq mi) or 13.8% is forested. Of the rest of the land, 1.09 km^{2} (0.42 sq mi) or 7.8% is settled (buildings or roads), 0.36 km^{2} (0.14 sq mi) or 2.6% is either rivers or lakes and 0.04 km^{2} (9.9 acres) or 0.3% is unproductive land.

Of the built up area, industrial buildings made up 3.2% of the total area while housing and buildings made up 0.0% and transportation infrastructure made up 0.1%. while parks, green belts and sports fields made up 4.2%. Out of the forested land, 11.9% of the total land area is heavily forested and 1.9% is covered with orchards or small clusters of trees. Of the agricultural land, 70.0% is used for growing crops, while 5.5% is used for orchards or vine crops. Of the water in the municipality, 1.0% is in lakes and 1.6% is in rivers and streams.

In 1995 the municipality was created when Buch bei Frauenfeld and Uesslingen merged.

== Demographics ==
Uesslingen-Buch has a population (as of December 2020) of 1,096. As of 2008, 4.8% of the population are foreign nationals. Over the last 10 years (1997–2007) the population has changed at a rate of 1.3%. Most of the population (as of 2000) speaks German (97.2%), with Italian being second most common ( 0.6%) and English being third ( 0.4%).

As of 2008, the gender distribution of the population was 50.9% male and 49.1% female. The population was made up of 502 Swiss men (48.0% of the population), and 30 (2.9%) non-Swiss men. There were 493 Swiss women (47.2%), and 20 (1.9%) non-Swiss women.

In 2008 there were 6 live births to Swiss citizens and births to non-Swiss citizens, and in same time span there were 4 deaths of Swiss citizens. Ignoring immigration and emigration, the population of Swiss citizens increased by 2 while the foreign population remained the same. There were 1 Swiss woman who emigrated from Switzerland to another country, 2 non-Swiss men who emigrated from Switzerland to another country and 1 non-Swiss woman who emigrated from Switzerland to another country. The total Swiss population change in 2008 (from all sources) was a decrease of 6 and the non-Swiss population change was a decrease of 1 people. This represents a population growth rate of -0.7%.

The age distribution, as of 2009, in Uesslingen-Buch is; 104 children or 9.9% of the population are between 0 and 9 years old and 160 teenagers or 15.2% are between 10 and 19. Of the adult population, 110 people or 10.5% of the population are between 20 and 29 years old. 110 people or 10.5% are between 30 and 39, 223 people or 21.2% are between 40 and 49, and 141 people or 13.4% are between 50 and 59. The senior population distribution is 102 people or 9.7% of the population are between 60 and 69 years old, 71 people or 6.7% are between 70 and 79, there are 29 people or 2.8% who are between 80 and 89, and there are 2 people or 0.2% who are 90 and older.

As of 2000, there were 369 private households in the municipality, and an average of 2.8 persons per household. In 2000 there were 155 single family homes (or 80.7% of the total) out of a total of 192 inhabited buildings. There were 27 two family buildings (14.1%), 4 three family buildings (2.1%) and 6 multi-family buildings (or 3.1%). There were 212 (or 20.4%) persons who were part of a couple without children, and 672 (or 64.6%) who were part of a couple with children. There were 38 (or 3.7%) people who lived in single parent home, while there are 13 persons who were adult children living with one or both parents, 3 persons who lived in a household made up of relatives, 8 who lived in a household made up of unrelated persons, and 10 who are either institutionalized or live in another type of collective housing.

The vacancy rate for the municipality, in 2008, was 0.47%. As of 2007, the construction rate of new housing units was 1.9 new units per 1000 residents. In 2000 there were 403 apartments in the municipality. The most common apartment size was the 6 room apartment of which there were 125. There were 9 single room apartments and 125 apartments with six or more rooms. As of 2000 the average price to rent an average apartment in Uesslingen-Buch was 1235.70 Swiss francs (CHF) per month (US$990, £560, €790 approx. exchange rate from 2000). The average rate for a one-room apartment was 530.00 CHF (US$420, £240, €340), a two-room apartment was about 908.24 CHF (US$730, £410, €580), a three-room apartment was about 1111.67 CHF (US$890, £500, €710) and a six or more room apartment cost an average of 2005.00 CHF (US$1600, £900, €1280). The average apartment price in Uesslingen-Buch was 110.7% of the national average of 1116 CHF.

In the 2007 federal election the most popular party was the SVP which received 47.99% of the vote. The next three most popular parties were the CVP (18.48%), the Green Party (11.23%) and the SP (8.61%). In the federal election, a total of 426 votes were cast, and the voter turnout was 54.5%.

The historical population is given in the following table:

year	population
1950	799
1960	778
1980	830
1990	918
2000	1,041

== Heritage sites of national significance ==
The Catholic St Sebastians Chapel is listed as a Swiss heritage site of national significance. The hamlets of Iselisberg and Trüttlikon are part of the Inventory of Swiss Heritage Sites.

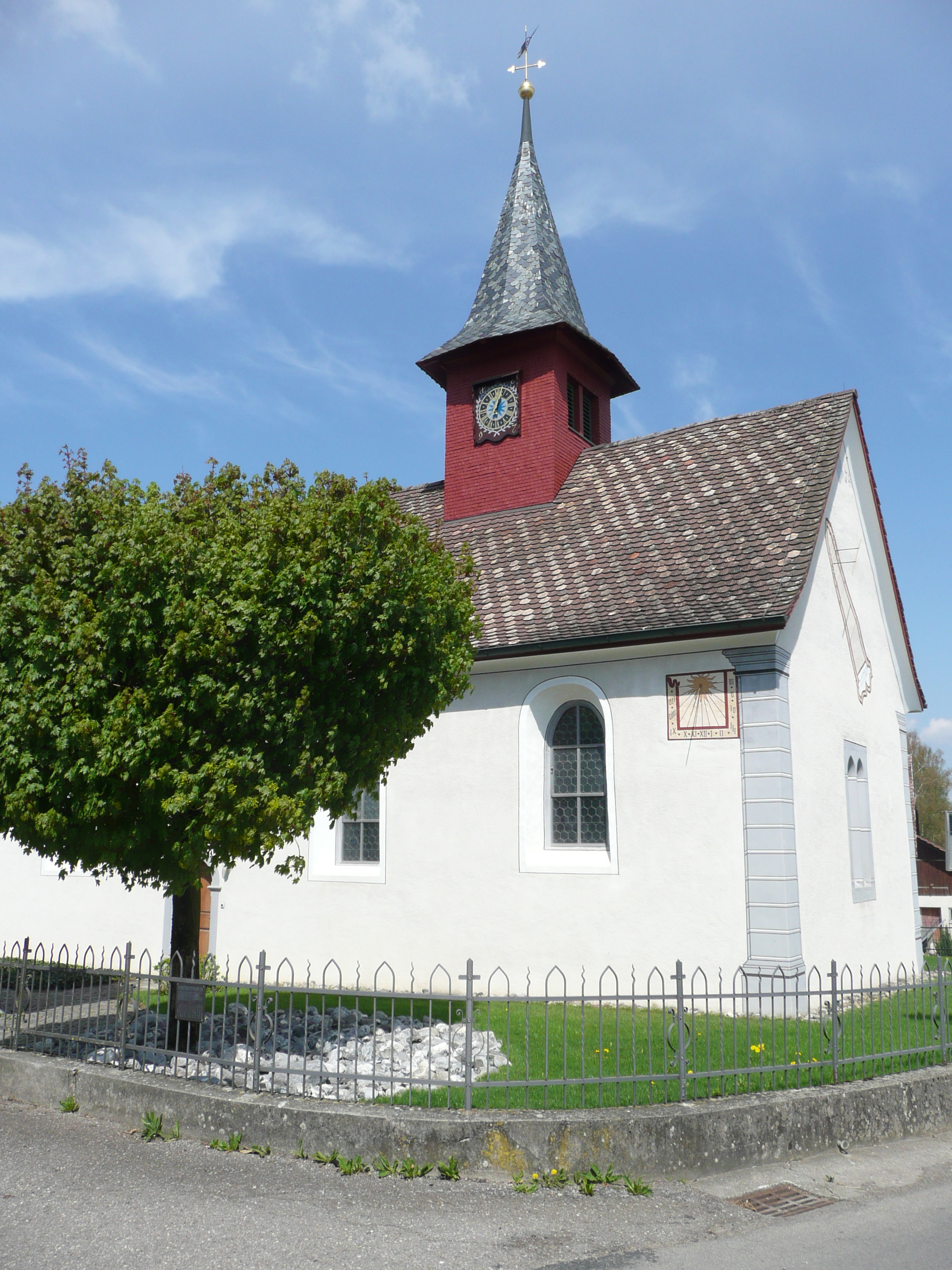
St. Sebastian's Chapel

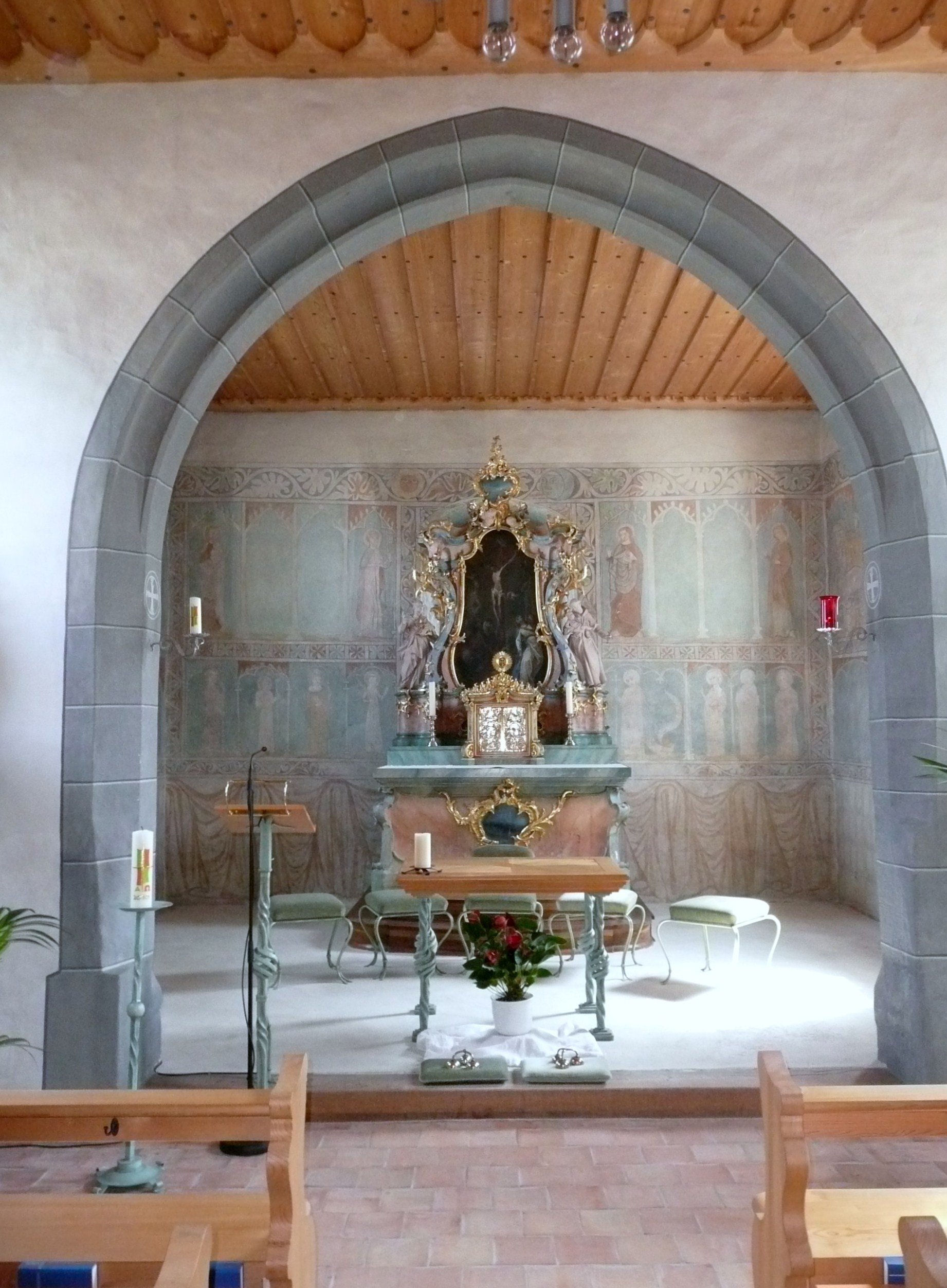
Altar in the chapel

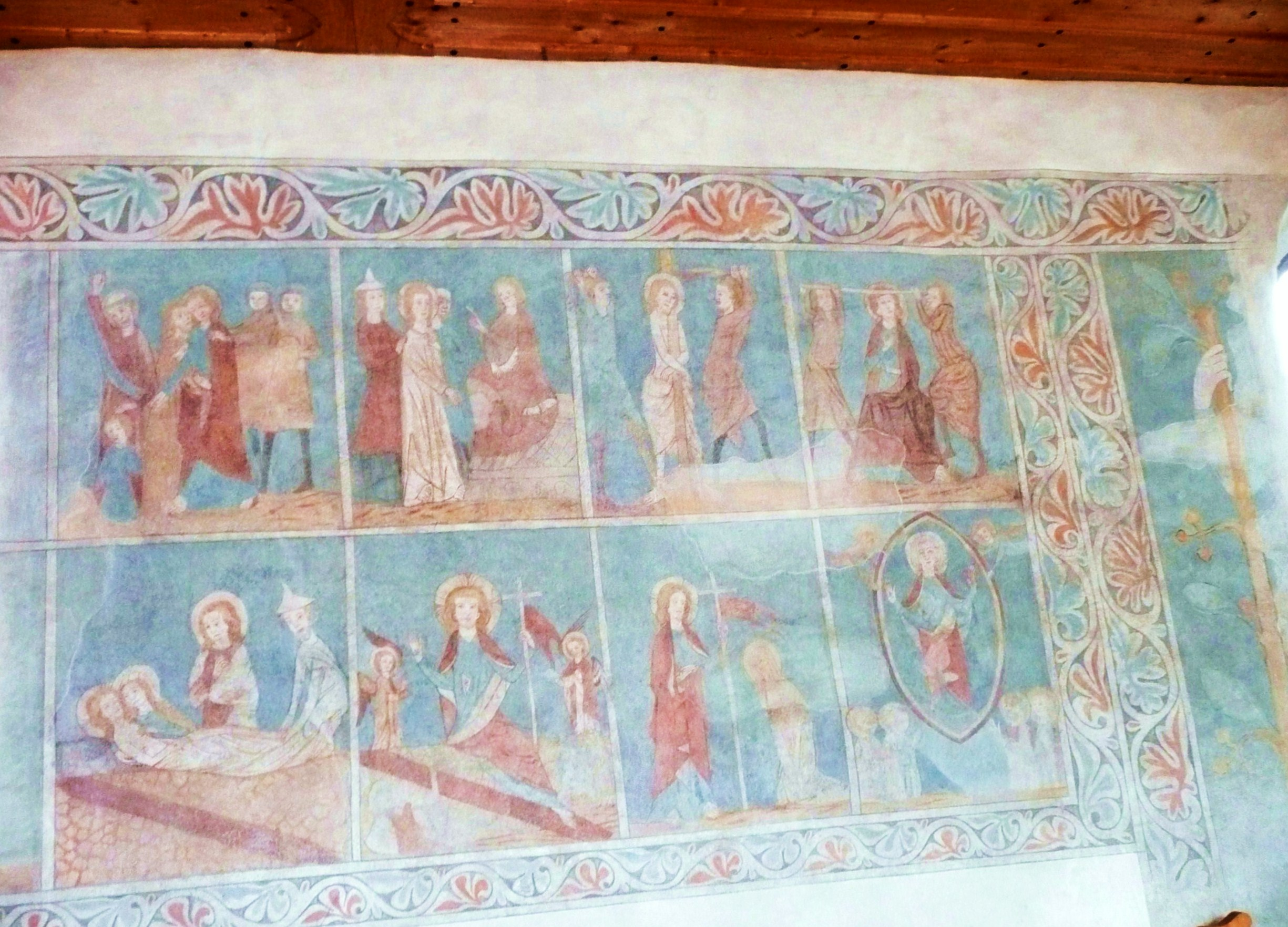
Paintings in the chapel

== Economy ==
As of 2007, Uesslingen-Buch had an unemployment rate of 0.63%. As of 2005, there were 178 people employed in the primary economic sector and about 70 businesses involved in this sector. 60 people are employed in the secondary sector and there are 11 businesses in this sector. 105 people are employed in the tertiary sector, with 31 businesses in this sector.

In 2000 there were 758 workers who lived in the municipality. Of these, 354 or about 46.7% of the residents worked outside Uesslingen-Buch while 76 people commuted into the municipality for work. There were a total of 480 jobs (of at least 6 hours per week) in the municipality. Of the working population, 6.7% used public transportation to get to work, and 48.8% used a private car.

== Religion ==
From the 2000 census, 308 or 29.6% were Roman Catholic, while 585 or 56.2% belonged to the Swiss Reformed Church. Of the rest of the population, there is 1 individual who belongs to the Orthodox Church, and there are 25 individuals (or about 2.40% of the population) who belong to another Christian church. There were 10 (or about 0.96% of the population) who are Islamic. There are 1 individuals (or about 0.10% of the population) who belong to another church (not listed on the census), 81 (or about 7.78% of the population) belong to no church, are agnostic or atheist, and 30 individuals (or about 2.88% of the population) did not answer the question.

== Education ==
In Uesslingen-Buch about 80.5% of the population (between age 25-64) have completed either non-mandatory upper secondary education or additional higher education (either university or a Fachhochschule).

Uesslingen-Buch is home to the Uesslingen primary school district. In the 2008/2009 school year there were 66 students. There were 26 children in the kindergarten, and the average class size was 26 kindergartners. Of the children in kindergarten, 14 or 53.8% were female. The lower and upper primary levels begin at about age 5-6 and last for 6 years. There were 23 children in who were at the lower primary level and 17 children in the upper primary level. The average class size in the primary school was 20 students. At the lower primary level, there were 10 children or 43.5% of the total population who were female, . In the upper primary level, there were 11 or 64.7% who were female, 2 or 11.8% were not Swiss citizens and 2 or 11.8% did not speak German natively.
