= Ittingen Charterhouse =

Carthusian monastery near Warth, Thurgau, Switzerland

Coordinates: 47°35′02″N 8°52′02″E

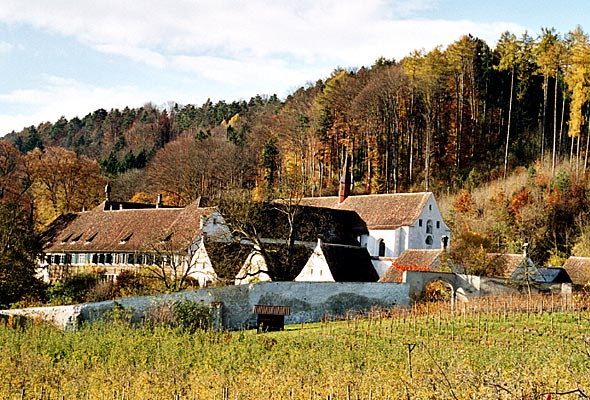
Ittingen Charterhouse

Ittingen Charterhouse (Kartause Ittingen) is a former Carthusian monastery near Warth, Canton Thurgau, Switzerland. It is now used as an education and seminar centre with two museums and a farm.

== History ==
Aerial view (1949)

The monastery was founded in 1150 for the Canons Regular. In 1461 the premises were sold to the Carthusians. In 1524, during the Reformation, the monastery was destroyed in the Ittingersturm, but was rebuilt during the Counter-Reformation. In 1798 the officials of the Helvetic Republic forbade the acceptance of novices and declared the monastery's assets the property of the state. Nevertheless the charterhouse survived until 1848, when it was finally dissolved.

Between 1867 and 1977 the estate was the private property of the Fehr family, who ran the former monastery and its land as an agricultural concern for several generations. The entire monastery precinct remained for the most part intact. After 1977 the property was taken over by the charitable foundation Kartause Ittingen and between 1979 and 1983 comprehensively restored.

== Present day ==
The buildings now accommodate the art museum of Canton Thurgau, the Ittinger Museum and tecum, an Evangelical meeting and education centre. There is also a residential home here for about 30 people with either mental illnesses or learning difficulties who are employed round the various businesses on the site. In addition, there are two hotels with 67 rooms altogether, and the restaurant Zur Mühle. The agricultural concern is among the biggest in the canton. As well as standard agriculture, grapes and hops are grown and from them wine and beer produced (the beer is brewed by Calanda Bräu in Chur) and milk from the estate's own cows is used for the production of various cheeses.

== Sources and external links ==
- Homepage of the Kartause Ittingen (in German)
- Ittingen in German, French and Italian in the online Historical Dictionary of Switzerland.
- Google Maps Ansicht der Kartause Ittingen
