= Neunforn =

- Municipality
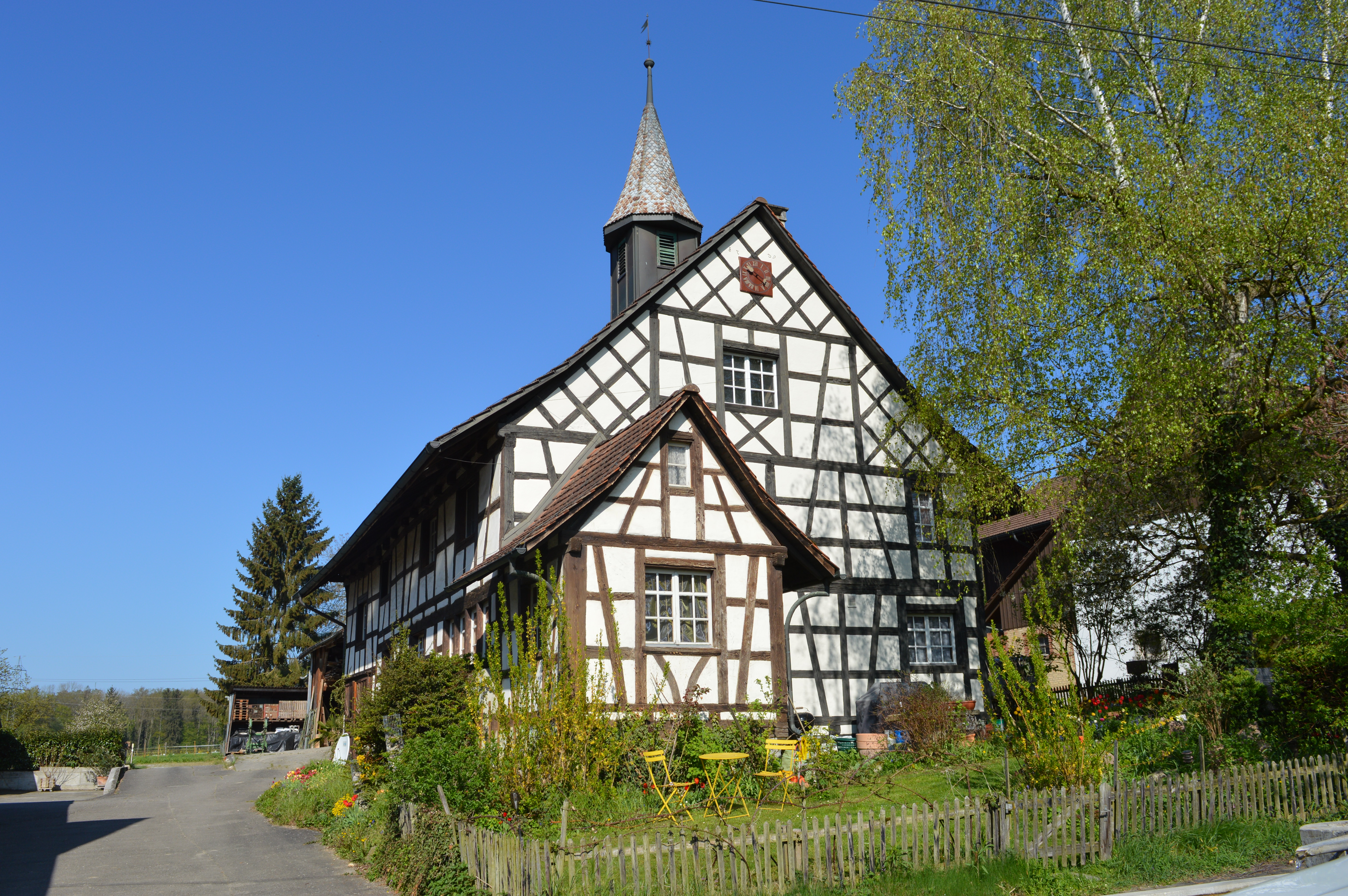
- The old school house in Fahrhof

- Coat of arms
- Location of Neunforn
- Location within Switzerland Location within Canton of Thurgau
- Coordinates: 47°36′N 8°47′E
- Country: Switzerland
- Canton: Thurgau
- District: Frauenfeld

Area
  - Total: 11.36 km^{2} (4.39 sq mi)
- Elevation: 460 m (1,510 ft)

Population (December 2007)
  - Total: 933
  - Density: 82.1/km^{2} (213/sq mi)
- Time zone: UTC+01:00 (CET)
  - Summer (DST): UTC+02:00 (CEST)
- Postal code: 8525
- SFOS number: 4601
- ISO 3166 code: CH-TG
- Localities: Niederneunforn, Oberneunforn, Wilen bei Neunforn
- Surrounded by: Altikon (ZH), Hüttwilen, Oberstammheim (ZH), Ossingen (ZH), Thalheim an der Thur (ZH), Uesslingen-Buch, Waltalingen (ZH)
- Website: www.neunforn.ch

Neunforn is a municipality in the district of Frauenfeld in the canton of Thurgau in Switzerland.

== History ==
Neunforn is first mentioned in 962 as Niuvora. In 963 a court was mentioned in the village. The Freiherr of Teufen sold his property in Neunforn to Töss Monastery in 1250. Around 1500 the low courts of Oberneunforn and Niederneunforn came into the same hands, and from 1554 both courts belonged to the Stokar family of Schaffhausen. From 1694 until 1798 the courts were owned by Zurich. The parish included Oberneunforn, Niederneunforn, Wilen and Burghof. In 1265, the parish was given as a donation to Töss Monastery, and was incorporated into the abbey in 1291. The Reformation reached and converted Neunforn in 1525. During the Protestant Reformation, Zurich closed Töss Monastery and took over the parish rights in Neunforn. Zurich retained the right to appoint the preacher in the parish until 1843.

== Geography ==
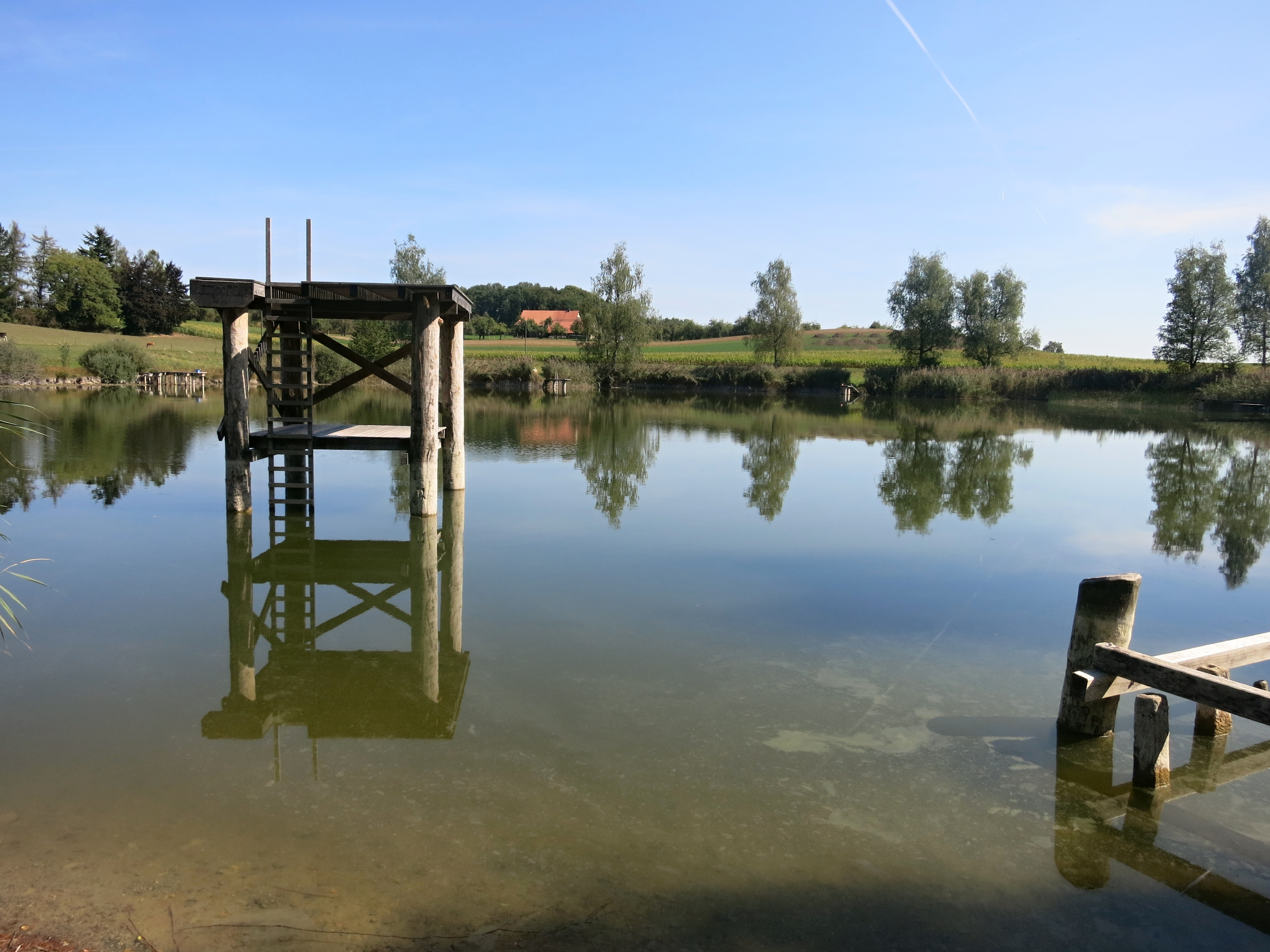
Wilenersee in Wilen bei Neunforn

Neunforn has an area, as of 2009, of 11.36 square kilometers (4.39 sq mi). Of this area, 7.46 km^{2} (2.88 sq mi) or 65.7% is used for agricultural purposes, while 2.78 km^{2} (1.07 sq mi) or 24.5% is forested. Of the rest of the land, 0.82 km^{2} (0.32 sq mi) or 7.2% is settled (buildings or roads), 0.19 km^{2} (0.073 sq mi) or 1.7% is either rivers or lakes and 0.12 km^{2} (30 acres) or 1.1% is unproductive land.

Of the built up area, industrial buildings made up 3.3% of the total area while housing and buildings made up 0.1% and transportation infrastructure made up 0.4%. while parks, green belts and sports fields made up 3.4%. Out of the forested land, 23.2% of the total land area is heavily forested and 1.2% is covered with orchards or small clusters of trees. Of the agricultural land, 58.5% is used for growing crops, while 7.1% is used for orchards or vine crops. Of the water in the municipality, 0.2% is in lakes and 1.5% is in rivers and streams.

The municipality is located in the Frauenfeld district in the lower Thur Valley. It consists of the villages of Oberneunforn, Niederneunforn and Wilen bei Neunforn.

== Demographics ==
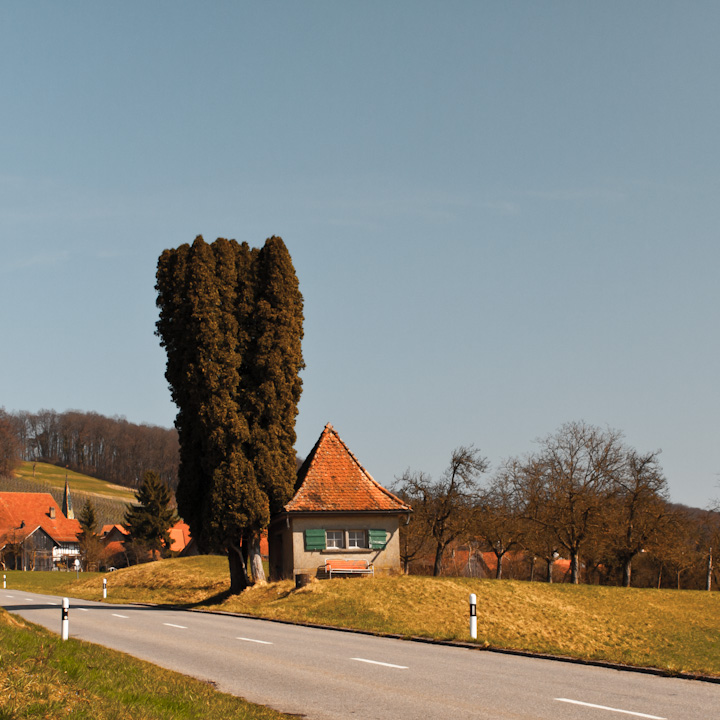
Niederneunforn Village, Neunforn

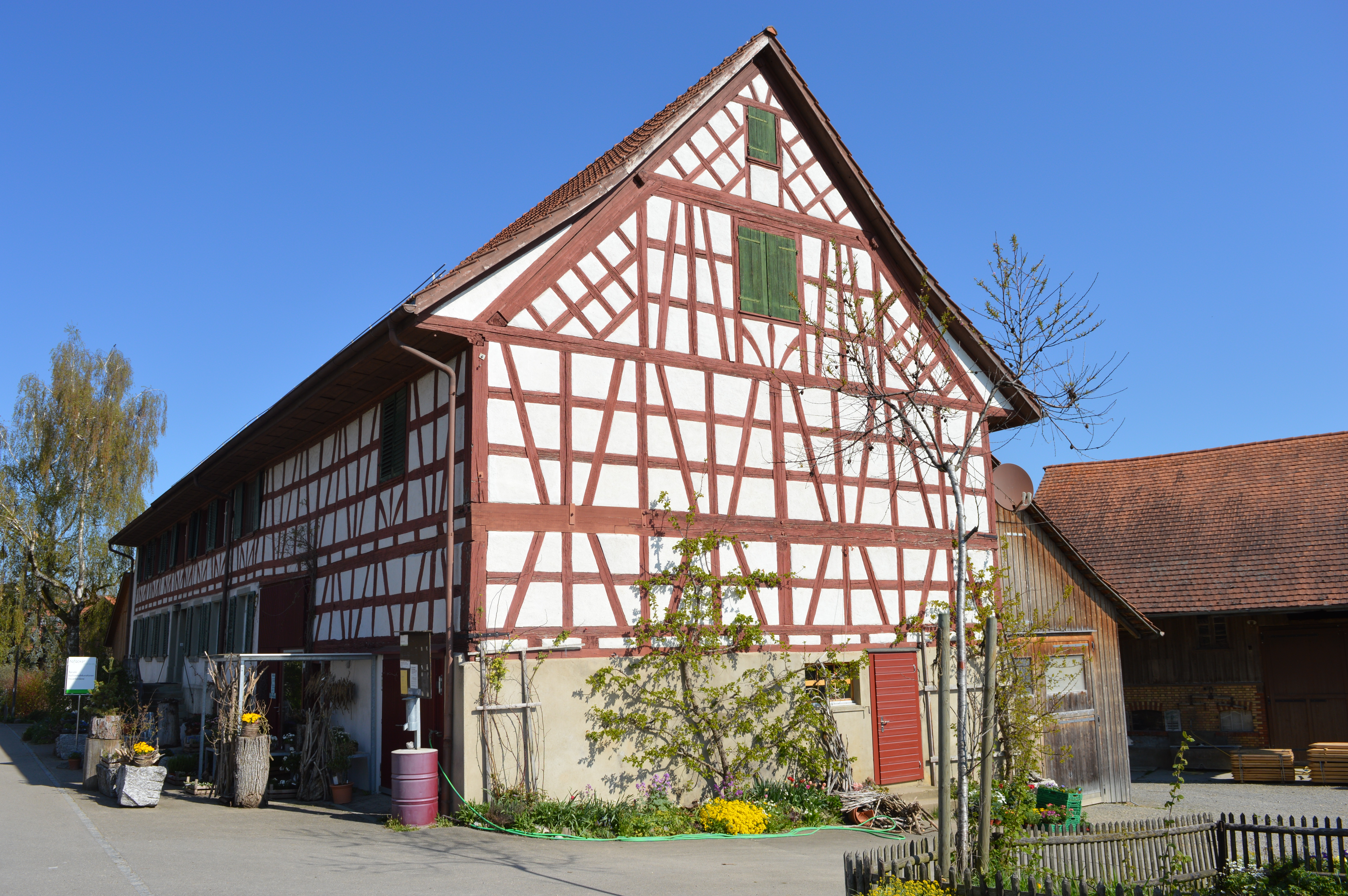
Half-timbered building in Neunforn

Neunforn has a population (as of December 2020) of 1,086. As of 2008, 6.4% of the population are foreign nationals. Over the last 10 years (1997–2007) the population has changed at a rate of -3.6%. Most of the population (as of 2000) speaks German (96.5%), with French being second most common (1.0%) and Serbo-Croatian being third (0.6%).

As of 2008, the gender distribution of the population was 49.8% male and 50.2% female. The population was made up of 442 Swiss men (46.3% of the population), and 33 (3.5%) non-Swiss men. There were 451 Swiss women (47.3%), and 28 (2.9%) non-Swiss women.

In 2008 there were 7 live births to Swiss citizens and 1 birth to non-Swiss citizens, and in same time span there were 7 deaths of Swiss citizens. Ignoring immigration and emigration, the population of Swiss citizens remained the same while the foreign population increased by 1. There was 1 Swiss man, 1 Swiss woman who emigrated from Switzerland to another country, 3 non-Swiss men who emigrated from Switzerland to another country and 1 non-Swiss woman who emigrated from Switzerland to another country. The total Swiss population change in 2008 (from all sources) was an increase of 16 and the non-Swiss population change was an increase of 12 people. This represents a population growth rate of 3.0%.

The age distribution, as of 2009, in Neunforn is; 77 children or 7.8% of the population are between 0 and 9 years old and 121 teenagers or 12.3% are between 10 and 19. Of the adult population, 117 people or 11.9% of the population are between 20 and 29 years old. 101 people or 10.2% are between 30 and 39, 171 people or 17.3% are between 40 and 49, and 160 people or 16.2% are between 50 and 59. The senior population distribution is 135 people or 13.7% of the population are between 60 and 69 years old, 54 people or 5.5% are between 70 and 79, there are 45 people or 4.6% who are between 80 and 89, and there are 5 people or 0.5% who are 90 and older.

As of 2000, there were 343 private households in the municipality, and an average of 2.7 persons per household. In 2000 there were 195 single family homes (or 89.4% of the total) out of a total of 218 inhabited buildings. There were 16 two family buildings (7.3%), 6 three family buildings (2.8%) and 1 multi-family buildings (or 0.5%). There were 219 (or 23.7%) persons who were part of a couple without children, and 586 (or 63.3%) who were part of a couple with children. There were 25 (or 2.7%) people who lived in single parent home, while there are 13 persons who were adult children living with one or both parents, 4 persons who lived in a household made up of relatives, 6 who lived in a household made up of unrelated persons, and 1 person who is either institutionalized or lives in another type of collective housing.

The vacancy rate for the municipality, in 2008, was 2.2%. As of 2007, the construction rate of new housing units was 2.2 new units per 1000 residents. In 2000 there were 366 apartments in the municipality. The most common apartment size was the 5 room apartment of which there were 116. There were 5 single room apartments and 108 apartments with six or more rooms. As of 2000 the average price to rent an average apartment in Neunforn was 1165.15 Swiss francs (CHF) per month (US$930, £520, €750 approx. exchange rate from 2000). The average rate for a one-room apartment was 660.00 CHF (US$530, £300, €420), a two-room apartment was about 729.00 CHF (US$580, £330, €470), a three-room apartment was about 1024.35 CHF (US$820, £460, €660) and a six or more room apartment cost an average of 1489.00 CHF (US$1190, £670, €950). The average apartment price in Neunforn was 104.4% of the national average of 1116 CHF.

In the 2007 federal election the most popular party was the SVP which received 52.07% of the vote. The next three most popular parties were the Green Party (11.93%), the CVP (11.15%) and the SP (9.56%). In the federal election, a total of 389 votes were cast, and the voter turnout was 54.0%.

The historical population is given in the following table:

year	population
1831	1,303
1850	1,123
1900	778
1950	653
1990	832
2000	926

== Heritage sites of national significance ==
The Reformed Church is listed as a Swiss heritage site of national significance. The villages of Niederneunforn, Oberneunforn, Wilen bei Neunforn and the hamlet of Farhof are all listed in the Inventory of Swiss Heritage Sites.

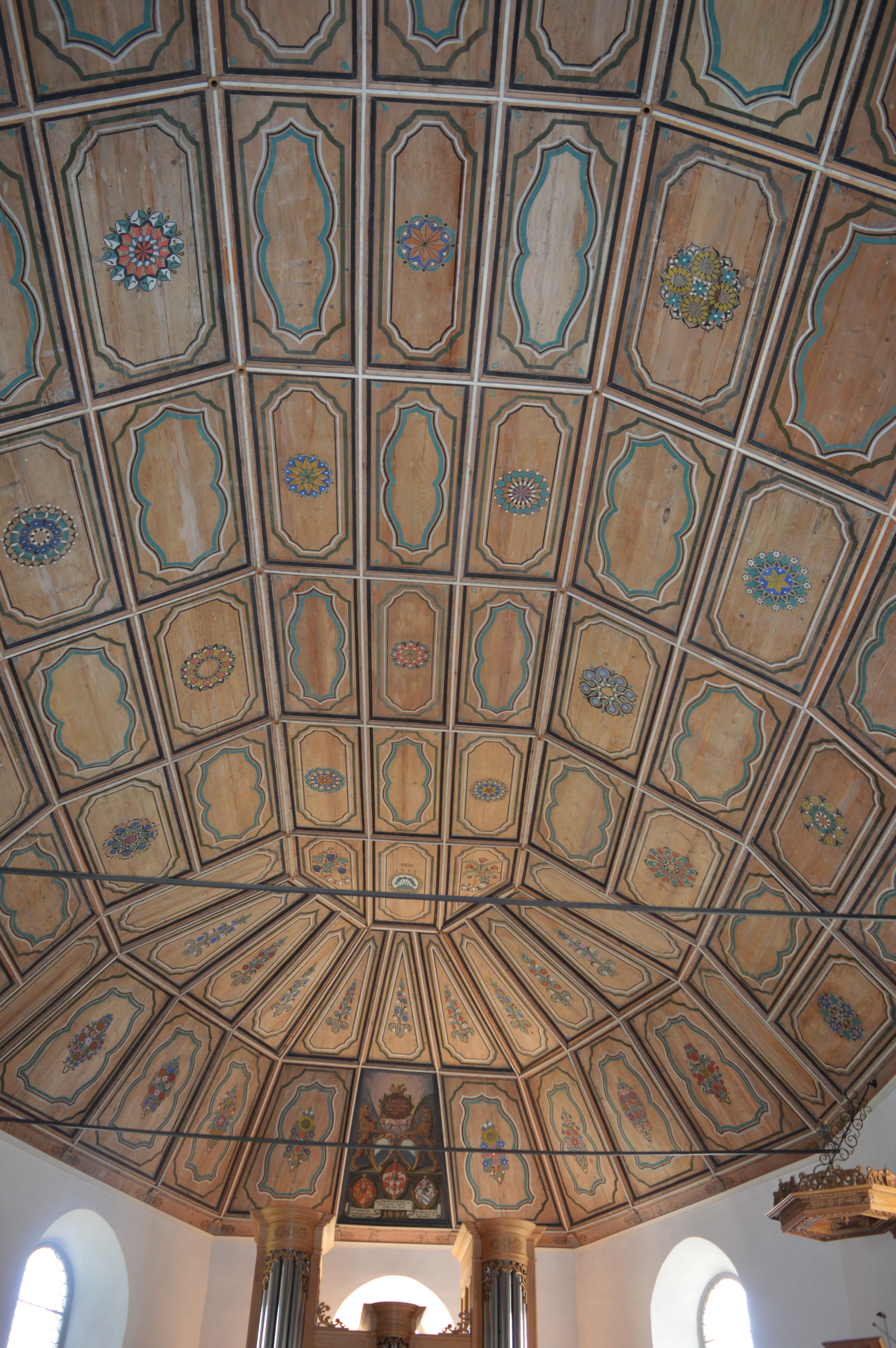
Interior of the church in Oberneunforn

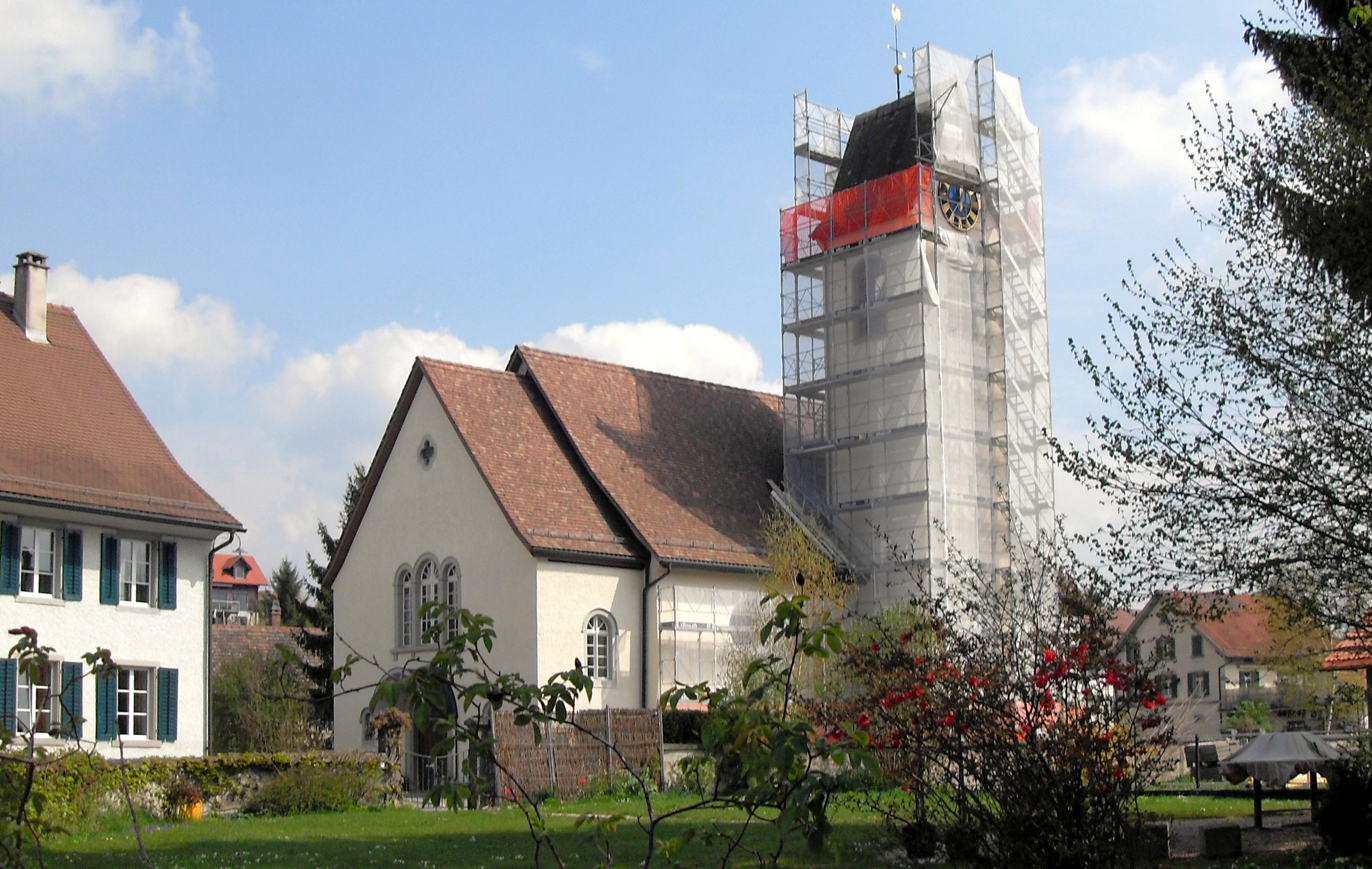
Oberneunforn church undergoing repairs

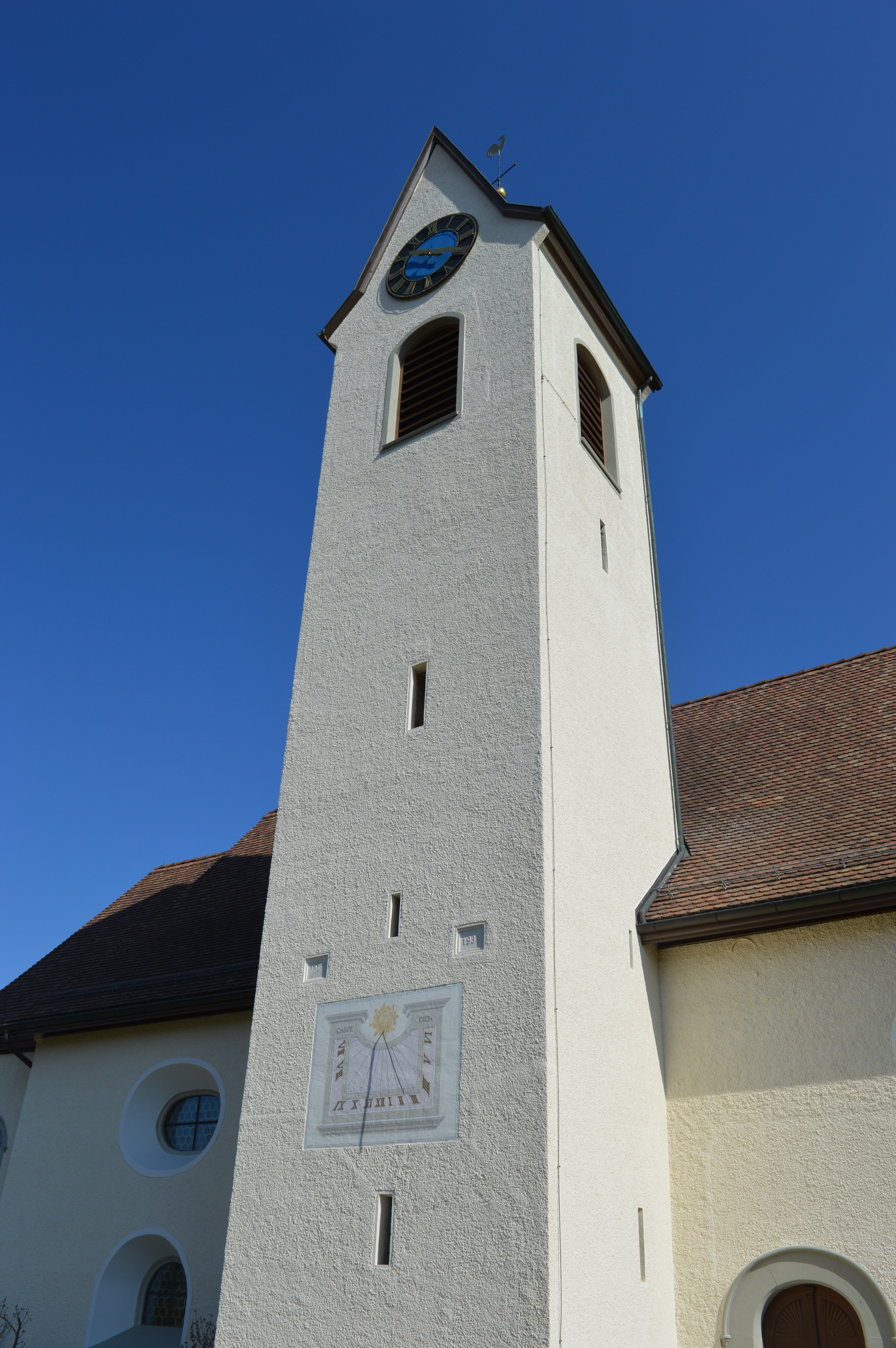
Bell tower of the church

== Economy ==
As of 2007, Neunforn had an unemployment rate of 0.49%. As of 2005, there were 117 people employed in the primary economic sector and about 42 businesses involved in this sector. 115 people are employed in the secondary sector and there are 12 businesses in this sector. 79 people are employed in the tertiary sector, with 25 businesses in this sector.

In 2000 there were 681 workers who lived in the municipality. Of these, 328 or about 48.2% of the residents worked outside Neunforn while 70 people commuted into the municipality for work. There were a total of 423 jobs (of at least 6 hours per week) in the municipality. Of the working population, 9.3% used public transportation to get to work, and 54% used a private car.

== Religion ==
From the 2000 census, 108 or 11.7% were Roman Catholic, while 683 or 73.8% belonged to the Swiss Reformed Church. Of the rest of the population, there are 8 individuals (or about 0.86% of the population) who belong to the Orthodox Church, and there are 13 individuals (or about 1.40% of the population) who belong to another Christian church. There were 2 individuals (or about 0.22% of the population) who were Jewish, and 7 (or about 0.76% of the population) who are Islamic. There are 3 individuals (or about 0.32% of the population) who belong to another church (not listed on the census), 98 (or about 10.58% of the population) belong to no church, are agnostic or atheist, and 4 individuals (or about 0.43% of the population) did not answer the question.

== Education ==
In Neunforn about 84.2% of the population (between age 25-64) have completed either non-mandatory upper secondary education or additional higher education (either university or a Fachhochschule).

Neunforn is home to the Neunforn primary school district. In the 2008/2009 school year there were 71 students. There were 11 children in the kindergarten, and the average class size was 11 kindergartners. Of the children in kindergarten, 4 or 36.4% were female, 3 or 27.3% were not Swiss citizens and 3 or 27.3% did not speak German natively. The lower and upper primary levels began at about age 5-6 and lasted for 6 years. There were 28 children in who were at the lower primary level and 32 children in the upper primary level. The average class size in the primary school was 20 students. At the lower primary level, there were 12 children or 42.9% who were female, 1 or 3.6% were not Swiss citizens and 2 or 7.1% did not speak German natively. In the upper primary level, there were 17 or 53.1% who were female, 3 or 9.4% were not Swiss citizens and 5 or 15.6% did not speak German natively.
