= Trüttlikon =

Village in the canton of Thurgau, Switzerland

Coordinates: 47°35′46″N 8°49′6″E

- Village
- Location in Switzerland

Trüttlikon is a village in the canton of Thurgau, Switzerland.

It was first recorded in year 1155 as Truchtelincofen.

Trüttlikon is located in the former municipality Buch bei Frauenfeld. In 1995 Buch bei Frauenfeld municipality merged with its neighbor to form a new and larger municipality Uesslingen-Buch.
