= Uesslingen =

Former municipality and village in Thurgau, Switzerland

Coordinates: 47°35′N 8°49′E

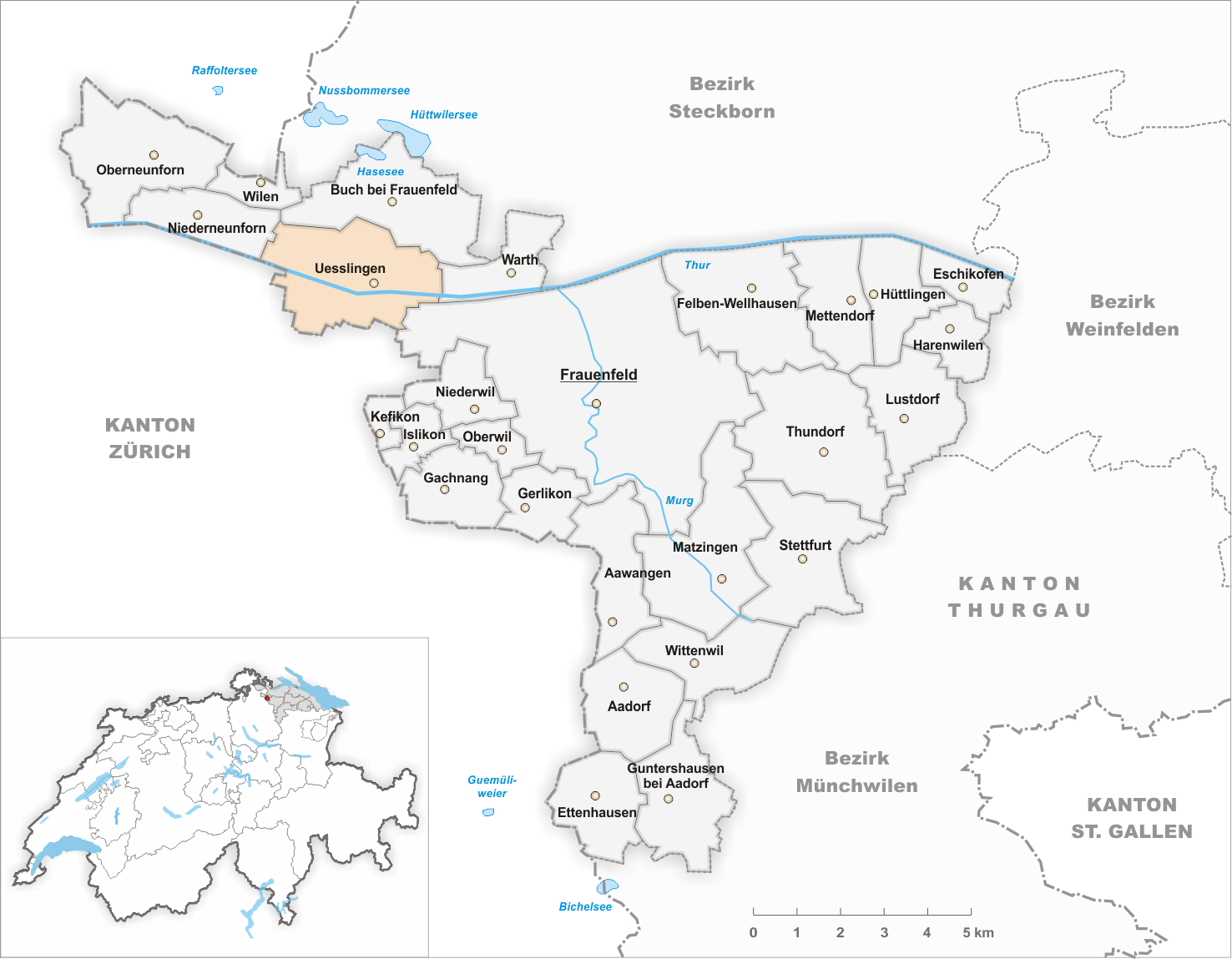
Map of the municipality

Uesslingen is a village and former municipality in the canton of Thurgau, Switzerland. In 1995, the municipality was merged with the neighboring municipality Buch bei Frauenfeld to form a new and larger municipality Uesslingen-Buch.
