= Oberneunforn =

Village in Thurgau, Switzerland

- Former municipality
- Southeastern entrance to the village
- Location of Oberneunforn
- Location within Switzerland Location within Canton of Thurgau
- Coordinates: 47.6077°N 8.771°E
- Country: Switzerland
- Canton: Thurgau
- District: Frauenfeld
- Municipality: Neunforn

Population (1990)
  - Total: 540
- Time zone: UTC+01:00 (CET)
  - Summer (DST): UTC+02:00 (CEST)
- ISO 3166 code: CH-TG
- Localities: Oberneunforn, Fahrhof, Münchhof, Langmühle
- Website

Oberneunforn is a former Ortsgemeinde (local commune) in the canton of Thurgau, Switzerland, now part of the municipality of Neunforn in the district of Frauenfeld. Oberneunforn, with Fahrhof, Münchhof and Langmühle, lies on the road from Frauenfeld to Schaffhausen.

== History ==
Hallstatt-period burial mounds lie in Oberneunforn; among other finds, a small Roman votive axe was found in them. A court site (Gerichtsstätte) existed in 963. In 1250 the barons (Freiherren) of Teufen sold their property to Töss Monastery, which in 1265 also secured the patronage of the church of Neunforn; this church has always stood in Oberneunforn. The lords of the court (Gerichtsherren) were Hans von Griesheim in 1442, the von Leuenberg family around 1500, the Stokar family of Schaffhausen from 1554, Hans Kaspar Escher in 1680 and the city of Zurich from 1694 to 1798. An Offnung (record of customary law) was written down in 1523.

The inhabitants practiced arable farming, viticulture, and livestock and dairy farming. After 1820 there was a private psychiatric clinic, and an agricultural cooperative was founded in 1887. At the beginning of the 21st century there were some small businesses.

From 1803 to 1995 Oberneunforn was an Ortsgemeinde of the Munizipalgemeinde (municipal commune) of Neunforn. It had 761 inhabitants in 1831, 570 in 1850, 467 in 1900, 382 in 1950 and 540 in 1990.

== Bibliography ==
- Der Landbote, 31 August 1963
- P. Wydler, Die Kirche zu Oberneunforn, 1988
- Nüfere, 1–, 2003–
- Albert Knoepfli, Der Bezirk Frauenfeld, 1950, 321–329 (Die Kunstdenkmäler des Kantons Thurgau, 1)
