= Warth-Weiningen =

- Municipality
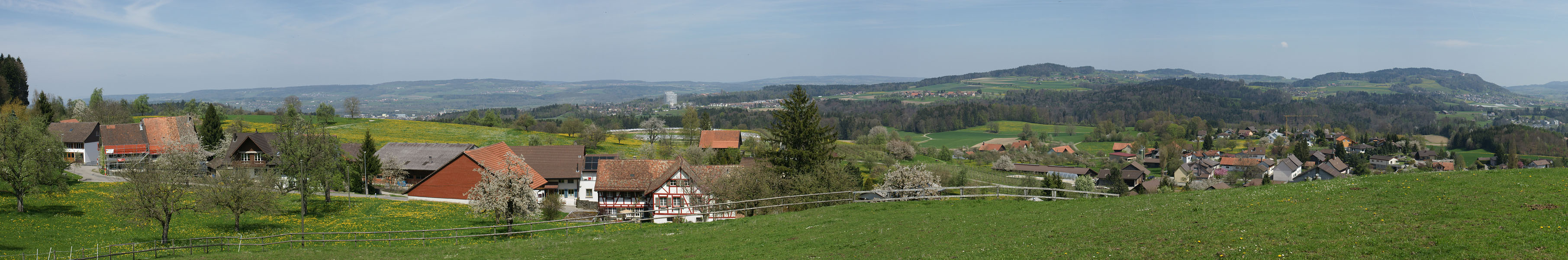

- Coat of arms
- Location of Warth-Weiningen
- Location within Switzerland Location within Canton of Thurgau
- Coordinates: 47°35′N 8°52′E
- Country: Switzerland
- Canton: Thurgau
- District: Frauenfeld

Area
  - Total: 8.2 km^{2} (3.2 sq mi)
- Elevation: 445 m (1,460 ft)

Population (December 2007)
  - Total: 1,174
  - Density: 140/km^{2} (370/sq mi)
- Time zone: UTC+01:00 (CET)
  - Summer (DST): UTC+02:00 (CEST)
- Postal code: 8532
- SFOS number: 4621
- ISO 3166 code: CH-TG
- Surrounded by: Felben-Wellhausen, Frauenfeld, Herdern, Hüttwilen, Pfyn, Uesslingen-Buch
- Website: www.warth-weiningen.ch

Warth-Weiningen is a municipality in the district of Frauenfeld in the canton of Thurgau in Switzerland.

== Geography ==
Warth-Weiningen has an area, as of 2009, of 8.2 square kilometers (3.2 sq mi). Of this area, 4.35 km^{2} (1.68 sq mi) or 53.0% is used for agricultural purposes, while 2.35 km^{2} (0.91 sq mi) or 28.7% is forested. Of the rest of the land, 1.1 km^{2} (0.42 sq mi) or 13.4% is settled (buildings or roads), 0.27 km^{2} (0.10 sq mi) or 3.3% is either rivers or lakes and 0.17 km^{2} (0.066 sq mi) or 2.1% is unproductive land.

Of the built up area, industrial buildings made up 3.9% of the total area while housing and buildings made up 0.2% and transportation infrastructure made up 4.5%. while parks, green belts and sports fields made up 4.6%. Out of the forested land, 26.5% of the total land area is heavily forested and 2.2% is covered with orchards or small clusters of trees. Of the agricultural land, 47.0% is used for growing crops, while 6.1% is used for orchards or vine crops. Of the water in the municipality, 0.2% is in lakes and 3.0% is in rivers and streams.

In 1995 the municipality was formed through the merger of Warth and Weiningen.

== Demographics ==
Warth-Weiningen has a population (as of December 2020) of 1,365 As of 2008, 5.9% of the population are foreign nationals. Over the last 10 years (1997–2007) the population has changed at a rate of 5.7%. Most of the population (as of 2000) speaks German(97.3%), with English being second most common ( 0.4%) and Portuguese being third ( 0.4%).

As of 2008, the gender distribution of the population was 50.0% male and 50.0% female. The population was made up of 560 Swiss men (47.1% of the population), and 34 (2.9%) non-Swiss men. There were 558 Swiss women (47.0%), and 36 (3.0%) non-Swiss women.

In 2008 there were 8 live births to Swiss citizens and births to non-Swiss citizens, and in same time span there were 4 deaths of Swiss citizens. Ignoring immigration and emigration, the population of Swiss citizens increased by 4 while the foreign population remained the same. There were 2 Swiss women who emigrated from Switzerland to another country, 3 non-Swiss men who emigrated from Switzerland to another country and 1 non-Swiss woman who emigrated from Switzerland to another country. The total Swiss population change in 2008 (from all sources) was an increase of 10 and the non-Swiss population change was a decrease of 0 people. This represents a population growth rate of 0.8%.

The age distribution, as of 2009, in Warth-Weiningen is; 110 children or 9.2% of the population are between 0 and 9 years old and 139 teenagers or 11.6% are between 10 and 19. Of the adult population, 142 people or 11.8% of the population are between 20 and 29 years old. 118 people or 9.8% are between 30 and 39, 220 people or 18.3% are between 40 and 49, and 213 people or 17.7% are between 50 and 59. The senior population distribution is 147 people or 12.2% of the population are between 60 and 69 years old, 78 people or 6.5% are between 70 and 79, there are 33 people or 2.7% who are between 80 and 89, and there are 2 people or 0.2% who are 90 and older.

As of 2000, there were 412 private households in the municipality, and an average of 2.7 persons per household. In 2000 there were 249 single family homes (or 89.2% of the total) out of a total of 279 inhabited buildings. There were 22 two family buildings (7.9%), 3 three family buildings (1.1%) and 5 multi-family buildings (or 1.8%). There were 280 (or 24.8%) persons who were part of a couple without children, and 638 (or 56.4%) who were part of a couple with children. There were 60 (or 5.3%) people who lived in single parent home, while there are 8 persons who were adult children living with one or both parents, 8 persons who lived in a household made up of relatives, 8 who lived in a household made up of unrelated persons, and 39 who are either institutionalized or live in another type of collective housing.

The vacancy rate for the municipality, in 2008, was 1.27%. As of 2007, the construction rate of new housing units was 3.4 new units per 1000 residents. In 2000 there were 441 apartments in the municipality. The most common apartment size was the 5 room apartment of which there were 139. There were 8 single room apartments and 124 apartments with six or more rooms. As of 2000 the average price to rent an average apartment in Warth-Weiningen was 1301.41 Swiss francs (CHF) per month (US$1040, £590, €830 approx. exchange rate from 2000). The average rate for a one-room apartment was 495.00 CHF (US$400, £220, €320), a two-room apartment was about 752.33 CHF (US$600, £340, €480), a three-room apartment was about 1106.12 CHF (US$880, £500, €710) and a six or more room apartment cost an average of 1922.73 CHF (US$1540, £870, €1230). The average apartment price in Warth-Weiningen was 116.6% of the national average of 1116 CHF.

In the 2007 federal election the most popular party was the SVP which received 49.44% of the vote. The next three most popular parties were the CVP (13.95%), the Green Party (10.97%) and the FDP (9.86%). In the federal election, a total of 515 votes were cast, and the voter turnout was 56.7%.

The historical population is given in the following table:

| year | population |
|---|---|
| 1950 | 562 |
| 1960 | 585 |
| 1980 | 675 |
| 1990 | 996 |
| 2000 | 1,131 |

== Sights ==
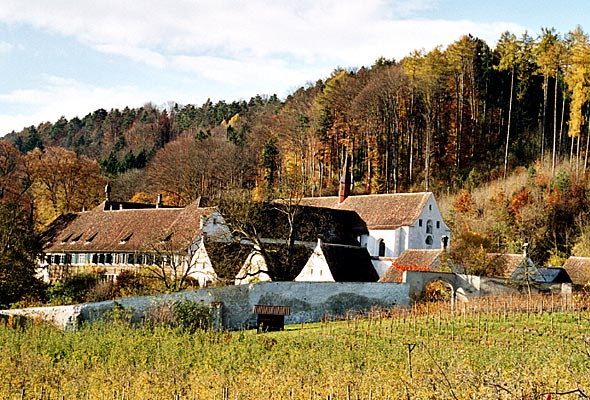
Ittingen Monastery

The Carthusian Ittingen Monastery is designated as part of the Inventory of Swiss Heritage Sites.

== Economy ==
As of 2007, Warth-Weiningen had an unemployment rate of 0.77%. As of 2005, there were 63 people employed in the primary economic sector and about 20 businesses involved in this sector. 97 people are employed in the secondary sector and there are 12 businesses in this sector. 268 people are employed in the tertiary sector, with 27 businesses in this sector.

In 2000 there were 839 workers who lived in the municipality. Of these, 435 or about 51.8% of the residents worked outside Warth-Weiningen while 204 people commuted into the municipality for work. There were a total of 608 jobs (of at least 6 hours per week) in the municipality. Of the working population, 9.9% used public transportation to get to work, and 52.8% used a private car.

== Religion ==
From the 2000 census, 352 or 31.1% were Roman Catholic, while 638 or 56.4% belonged to the Swiss Reformed Church. Of the rest of the population, there are 3 individuals (or about 0.27% of the population) who belong to the Orthodox Church, and there are 40 individuals (or about 3.54% of the population) who belong to another Christian church. There were 6 (or about 0.53% of the population) who are Islamic. There are 2 individuals (or about 0.18% of the population) who belong to another church (not listed on the census), 81 (or about 7.16% of the population) belong to no church, are agnostic or atheist, and 9 individuals (or about 0.80% of the population) did not answer the question.

== Education ==
In Warth-Weiningen about 84.7% of the population (between age 25-64) have completed either non-mandatory upper secondary education or additional higher education (either university or a Fachhochschule).

Warth-Weiningen is home to the Warth-Weiningen primary school district. In the 2008/2009 school year there were 106 students. There were 24 children in the kindergarten, and the average class size was 24 kindergartners. Of the children in kindergarten, 13 or 54.2% were female, 1 or 4.2% were not Swiss citizens and 1 or 4.2% did not speak German natively. The lower and upper primary levels begin at about age 5-6 and last for 6 years. There were 40 children in who were at the lower primary level and 42 children in the upper primary level. The average class size in the primary school was 16.4 students. At the lower primary level, there were 20 children or 50.0% of the total population who were female, and 1 or 2.5% did not speak German natively. In the upper primary level, there were 20 or 47.6% who were female.
