= Buch bei Frauenfeld =

Coordinates: 47°35′55.1″N 8°50′15.67″E

Buch bei Frauenfeld is a village and former municipality in the canton of Thurgau, Switzerland.

It was first recorded in year 1260 (765 years ago) as Buoch.

The municipality also contained the villages Trüttlikon, Hueb, Vorderhorben and Hinterhorben. It had 380 inhabitants in 1850, which decreased to 305 in 1900, 331 in 1950 and 333 in 1990.

In 1995 (30 years ago) the municipality was merged with the neighboring municipality Uesslingen to form a new and larger municipality Uesslingen-Buch.
