= Frauenfeld District =

Coordinates: 47°33′N 8°53′E

Frauenfeld District Bezirk Frauenfeld
- District
- Country: Switzerland
- Canton: Thurgau
- Capital: Frauenfeld

Area
  - Total: 279.6 km^{2} (108.0 sq mi)

Population (2020)
  - Total: 69,773
  - Density: 249.5/km^{2} (646.3/sq mi)
- Time zone: UTC+1 (CET)
  - Summer (DST): UTC+2 (CEST)
- Municipalities: 23

Frauenfeld District is one of the five districts of the canton of Thurgau, Switzerland. It has a population of 69,773 (as of 31 December 2020). Its capital, and the capital of Thurgau, is the city of Frauenfeld. The district shares borders with canton Zurich and canton Schaffhausen as well a river border with the German enclave of Büsingen am Hochrhein.

The district contains the following municipalities:

Coat of arms	Municipality	Population (31 December 2020)	Area km^{2}
	Basadingen-Schlattingen	1,818	15.7
	Berlingen	906	4.0
	Diessenhofen	4,085	10.0
	Eschenz	1,868	12.0
	Felben-Wellhausen	2,874	7.3
	Frauenfeld	25,974	27.4
	Gachnang	4,483	9.7
	Herdern	1,117	13.7
	Homburg	1,543	24.1
	Hüttlingen	829	11.6
	Hüttwilen	1,765	17.6
	Mammern	677	5.5
	Matzingen	3,029	7.7
	Müllheim	3,002	8.7
	Neunforn	1,086	11.4
	Pfyn	2,103	13.0
	Schlatt TG	1,814	15.5
	Steckborn	3,840	8.8
	Stettfurt	1,216	6.4
	Thundorf	1,513	15.6
	Uesslingen-Buch	1,096	14.0
	Wagenhausen	1,770	11.2
	Warth-Weiningen	1,365	8.3
	Total (23)	69,773	279.6
