= Mett-Oberschlatt =

Village in Thurgau, Switzerland

- Former municipality
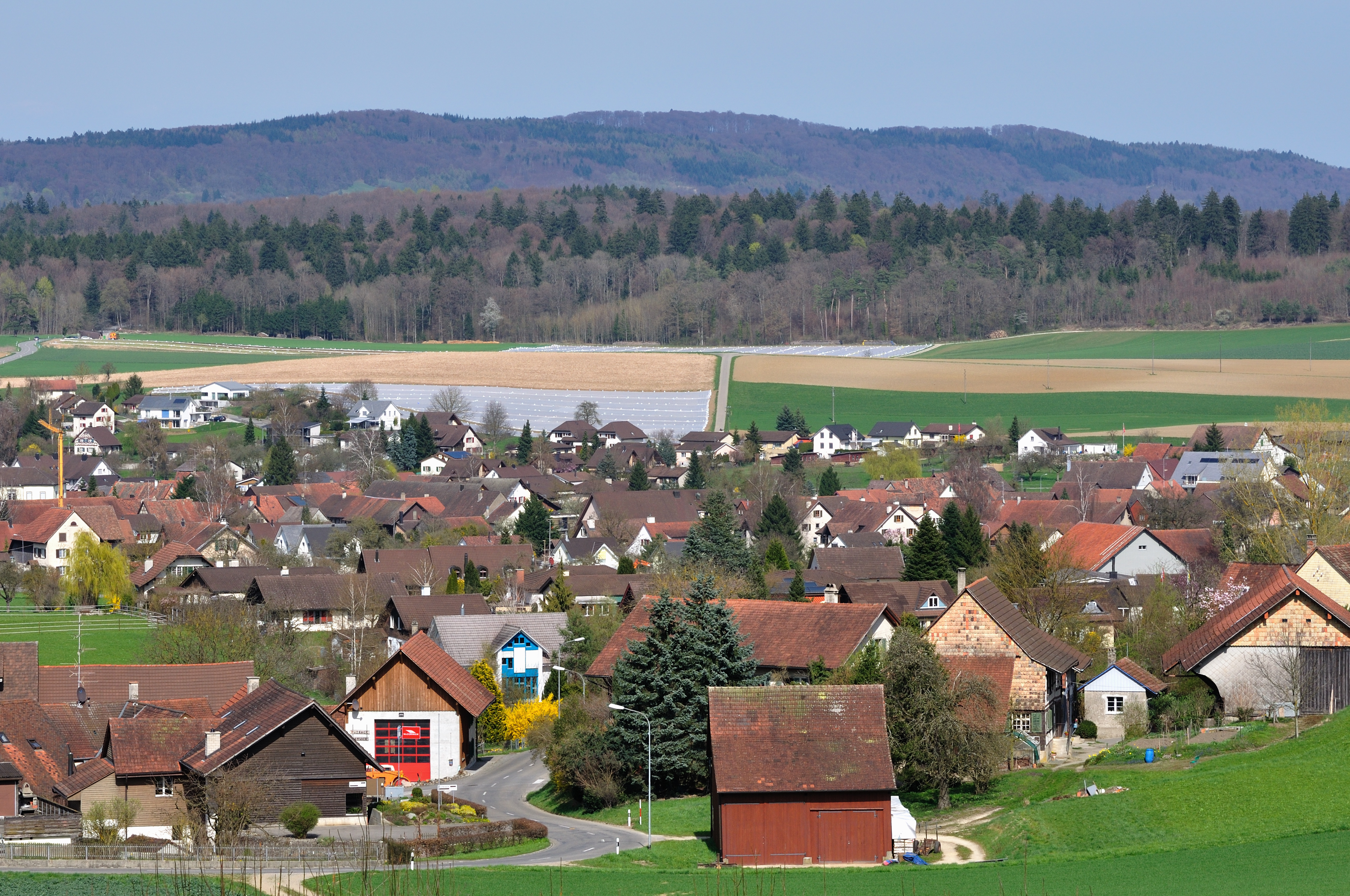
- Oberschlatt (foreground) and Mett-Schlatt (middle ground), seen from Wildensbuch
- Location of Mett-Oberschlatt
- Location within Switzerland Location within Canton of Thurgau
- Coordinates: 47.6579°N 8.6951°E
- Country: Switzerland
- Canton: Thurgau
- District: Diessenhofen
- Municipality: Schlatt

Population (1990)
  - Total: 326
- Time zone: UTC+01:00 (CET)
  - Summer (DST): UTC+02:00 (CEST)
- SFOS number: 4532
- ISO 3166 code: CH-TG
- Localities: Mett-Schlatt, Oberschlatt, Fallentor
- Website

Mett-Oberschlatt is a former Ortsgemeinde (local commune) in the canton of Thurgau, Switzerland. Since 1999 it has formed, together with Unterschlatt, the municipality of Schlatt, which lies near the road from Frauenfeld to Schaffhausen on the eastern slope of the Kohlfirst.

== History ==
Mett-Oberschlatt is first mentioned in 858 as Slate. In the Middle Ages the Kyburg and later Habsburg bailiwick (Vogtei) of Diessenhofen held jurisdiction over Mett-Oberschlatt. In the 15th century the town of Diessenhofen took over this jurisdiction and exercised it until 1798. The landowners were the Abbey of Saint Gall before 858, Rheinau Abbey from 858 and, from the 13th century, the St. Katharinental monastery among others.

The chapel of St. Nicholas in Mett-Oberschlatt, which existed from 1316 to 1812, belonged to Stammheim. The Reformation, carried out in 1529, led to the creation of the independent parish of Schlatt. Until 1769 the parish did without a pastor of its own; from the end of the 16th century it was served from Basadingen, and from 1625 to 1631 from Diessenhofen.

The Ortsgemeinde of Mett-Oberschlatt existed from 1803 to 1998 and was made up of the localities of Mett-Schlatt, Oberschlatt and Fallentor. From 1803 to 1816 it was part of the Munizipalgemeinde (municipal commune) of Diessenhofen, and from 1816 to 1998 part of the former Munizipalgemeinde of Basadingen. From 1969 the farming village carried out a land consolidation, and from the 1980s some service businesses were established. Mett-Oberschlatt had 203 inhabitants in 1800, 287 in 1850, 332 in 1870, 257 in 1900, 317 in 1950 and 326 in 1990.

== Bibliography ==
- Anzeiger am Rhein, 18 August 1961
- Die Kunstdenkmäler des Kantons Thurgau, 5, 1992, 254–283
