= Basadingen-Schlattingen =

- Municipality
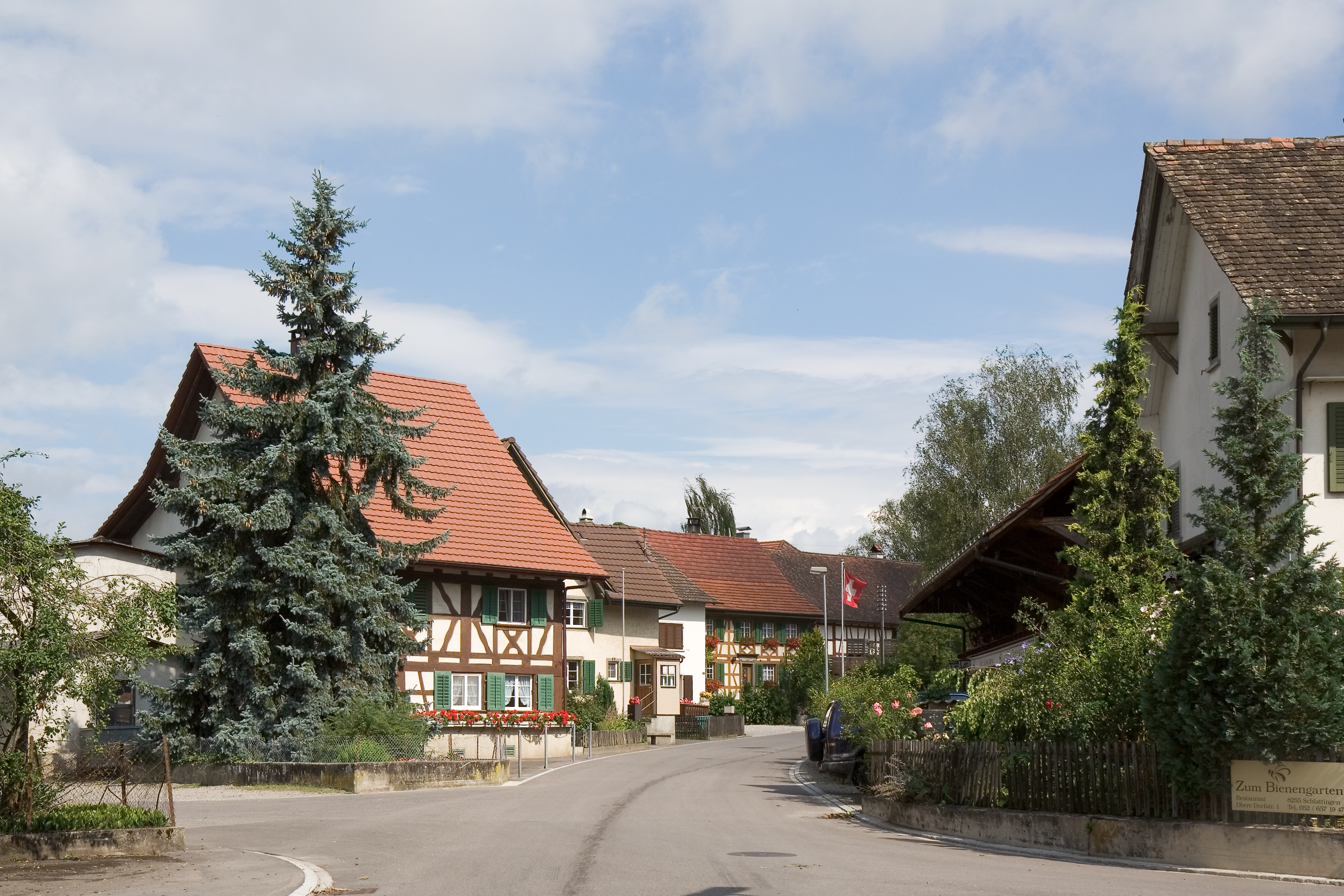
- Village street in Schlattingen

- Coat of arms
- Location of Basadingen-Schlattingen
- Location within Switzerland Location within Canton of Thurgau
- Coordinates: 47°40′N 8°45′E
- Country: Switzerland
- Canton: Thurgau
- District: Frauenfeld

Area
  - Total: 15.64 km^{2} (6.04 sq mi)
- Elevation: 410 m (1,350 ft)

Population (December 2007)
  - Total: 1,679
  - Density: 107.4/km^{2} (278.0/sq mi)
- Time zone: UTC+01:00 (CET)
  - Summer (DST): UTC+02:00 (CEST)
- Postal code: 8254
- SFOS number: 4536
- ISO 3166 code: CH-TG
- Localities: Basadingen, Schlattingen
- Surrounded by: Diessenhofen, Schlatt, Truttikon (ZH), Unterstammheim (ZH), Waltalingen (ZH)
- Website: www.basadingen.ch

Basadingen-Schlattingen is a municipality in Frauenfeld District in the canton of Thurgau in Switzerland.

It was formed on 1 January 1999 from the union of the municipalities of Basadingen and Schlattingen.

== History ==
Basadingen is first mentioned in 761 as Pasnandingas and Schlattingen is first mentioned in 897 as Slattingarro.

=== Basadingen ===
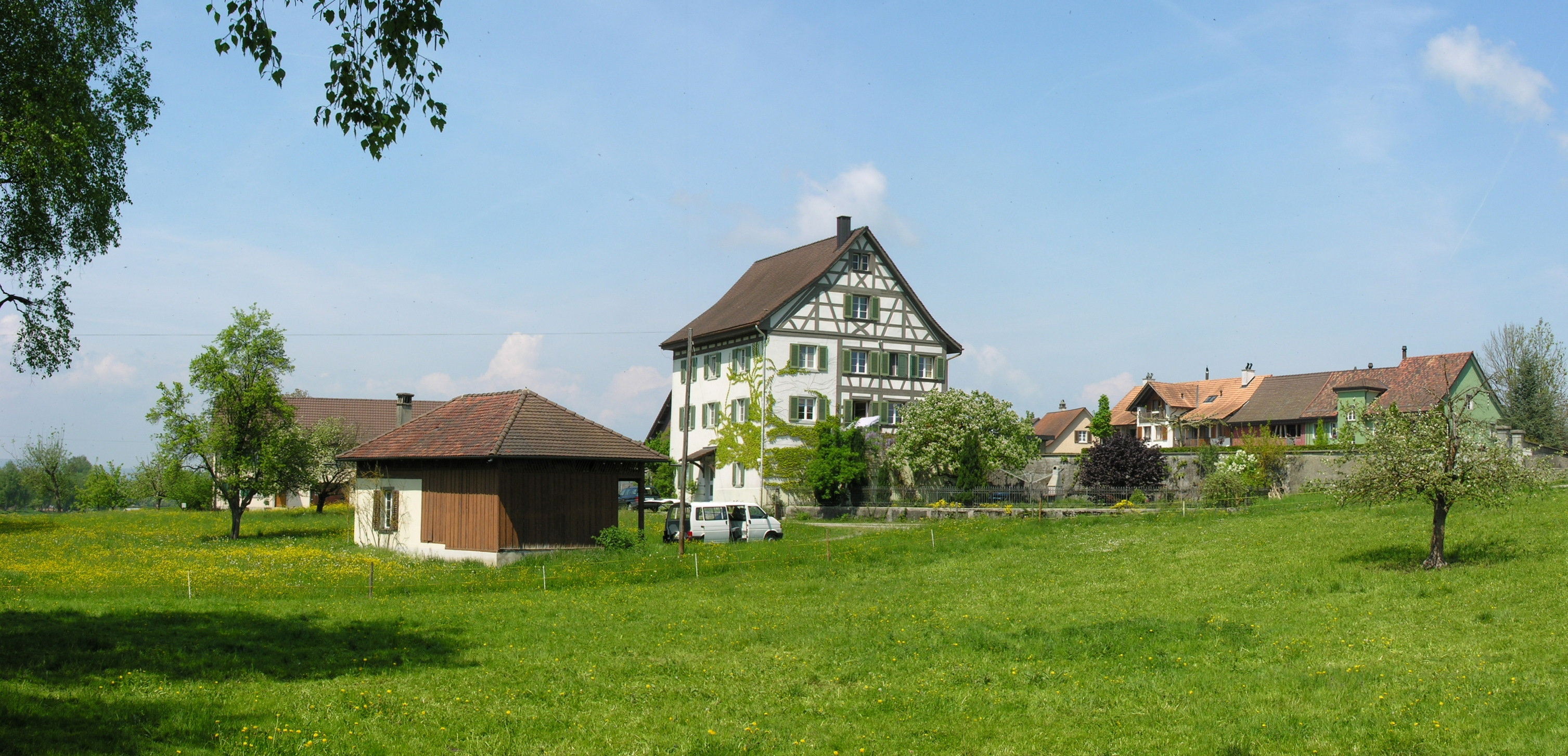
Basadingen

Early evidence of settlements includes, finds from the Neolithic period (e.g. on the Buchberg and Dickihof), and a Roman villa with graves in Unterschlatt. In the Early Middle Ages the monasteries of St. Gallen, Rheinau, Reichenau and Allerheiligen owned land in Basadingen. In 1260 the monastery of St. Katharinental bought Reichenau's Kehlhof (a farm owned by a monastery). By 1330 St. Katharinental had acquired many possessions in the village, as well as the low courts right and tithe rights. It became the sole landholder in the village. The high court rights were owned by the bailiwick of Diessenhofen by about 1300. In 1460 the high court transferred to the city of Diessenhofen, which also had the rights to the low court from 1527 until 1798.

During the High Middle Ages the village belonged partly to the parish of Stammheim (today Oberstammheim and Unterstammheim) and partly to the Basadingen parish, which was formed in the 13th century when St. Martin's Church was built. In 1264, the church was brought under the authority of the monastery of St. Katharinental. After the Protestant Reformation in 1529, the parish of Basadingen and the Basadingen portion of the Stammheim parish, were merged into a new Basadingen parish, which also included the village of Willisdorf. In 1631 a Catholic parish was established, and St. Martin's Church became a shared church, a condition that remains even today. In 1845 the existing church was dedicated.

During the Middle Ages, the number of farms decreased from 40 in 1328 to only 16 in 1433, only to double again from 1470 to 1550. After that village population, land use and number of farms remained stable until 1800. In 1800, the number of farms rose sharply. Large forests also favored the expansion of the woodworking industry. In 1900 an embroidery factory and a brickyard offered some jobs, but the village retained a strong farming village character until around 1970. Since then agricultural amelioration (mostly, relocation of fruit orchards) and a strong population growth has led to changes in the appearance and character of the village.

=== Schlattingen ===
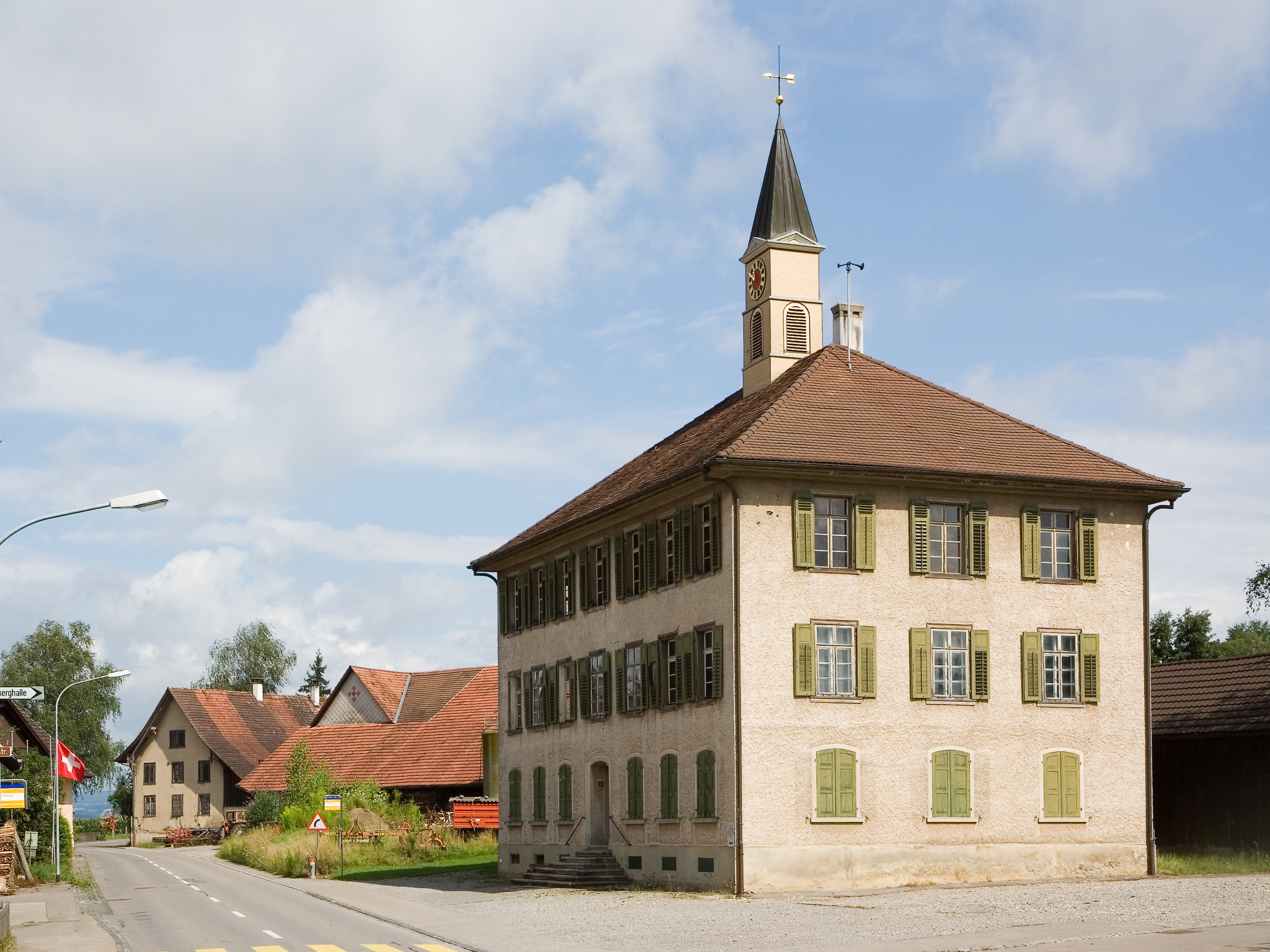
Schlattingen's school house and town hall

Finds from the Paleolithic and Roman era indicate that there were earlier settlements in the area. In the Middle Ages the monasteries of St. Gallen, Münsterlingen, St. Katharinental and Wagenhausen all held property and rights in Schlattingen. The town of Diessenhofen held the low court rights from 1489 to 1798 and the high court rights after 1460.

The right to appoint pastors of the village church (built in 1275) was held by the Göberg family. Soon after the Protestant Reformation, it became part of the parish of Stammheim and remained so until 1827. The Diessenhofen parish staff gave the sermon after 1585 in Schlattingen. In 1827 the church of Schlattingen became a filial church of Basadingen.

In the 18th century, the village acquired most of its own land and owned 259 acres (1.05 km^{2}) of woods. It produced grain, fruit, clover and grapes and in the 19th century there was increased dairy farming. Between 1920 and 1980, the proportion of jobs in agriculture dropped from 72% to 46%, while the services sector saw an increase from 6% to 29%. A new housing development opened in 1945.

== Geography ==
Basadingen-Schlattingen has an area, as of 2009, of 15.64 square kilometers (6.04 sq mi). Of this area, 9.4 km^{2} (3.6 sq mi) or 60.1% is used for agricultural purposes, while 4.91 km^{2} (1.90 sq mi) or 31.4% is forested. Of the rest of the land, 1.29 km^{2} (0.50 sq mi) or 8.2% is settled (buildings or roads), 0.05 km^{2} (12 acres) or 0.3% is either rivers or lakes and 0.02 km^{2} (4.9 acres) or 0.1% is unproductive land.

Of the built up area, industrial buildings made up 3.8% of the total area while housing and buildings made up 0.3% and transportation infrastructure made up 0.6%. while parks, green belts and sports fields made up 3.4%. Out of the forested land, 30.2% of the total land area is heavily forested and 1.2% is covered with orchards or small clusters of trees. Of the agricultural land, 59.1% is used for growing crops. All the water in the municipality is flowing water.

The municipality is located in Frauenfeld District. It consists of the villages of Basadingen and Schlattingen and the communities of Mett-Oberschlatt and Unterschlatt.

== Demographics ==
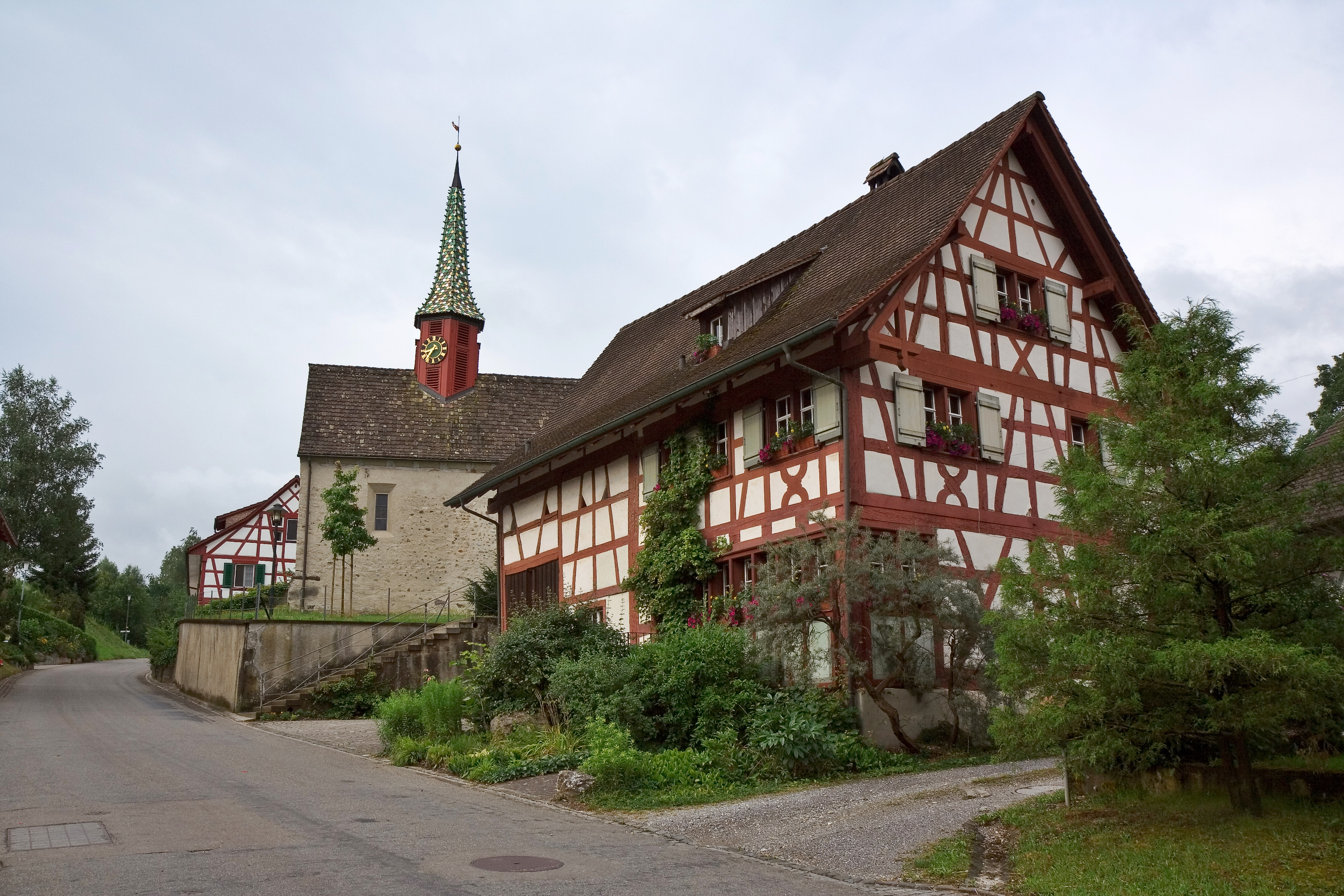
The church and village of Schlattingen

Basadingen-Schlattingen has a population (as of December 2020) of 1,818 As of 2008, 11.3% of the population are foreign nationals. Over the last 10 years (1997–2007) the population has changed at a rate of %. Most of the population (as of 2000) speaks German(95.7%), with Albanian being second most common ( 1.4%) and Italian being third ( 0.7%).

As of 2008, the gender distribution of the population was 50.3% male and 49.7% female. The population was made up of 734 Swiss men (44.0% of the population), and 106 (6.4%) non-Swiss men. There were 746 Swiss women (44.7%), and 83 (5.0%) non-Swiss women.

In 2008 there were 10 live births to Swiss citizens and 1 birth to non-Swiss citizens, and in same time span there were 13 deaths of Swiss citizens. Ignoring immigration and emigration, the population of Swiss citizens decreased by 3 while the foreign population increased by 1. There were 2 Swiss women who emigrated from Switzerland to another country, 11 non-Swiss men who emigrated from Switzerland to another country and 13 non-Swiss women who emigrated from Switzerland to another country. The total Swiss population change in 2008 (from all sources) was an increase of 14 and the non-Swiss population change was an increase of 18 people. This represents a population growth rate of 2.0%.

The age distribution, as of 2009, in Basadingen-Schlattingen is; 179 children or 10.5% of the population are between 0 and 9 years old and 226 teenagers or 13.3% are between 10 and 19. Of the adult population, 193 people or 11.4% of the population are between 20 and 29 years old. 177 people or 10.4% are between 30 and 39, 329 people or 19.4% are between 40 and 49, and 259 people or 15.2% are between 50 and 59. The senior population distribution is 170 people or 10.0% of the population are between 60 and 69 years old, 102 people or 6.0% are between 70 and 79, there are 57 people or 3.4% who are between 80 and 89, and there are 7 people or 0.4% who are 90 and older.

As of 2000, there were 567 private households in the municipality, and an average of 2.7 persons per household. In 2000 there were 327 single family homes (or 84.3% of the total) out of a total of 388 inhabited buildings. There were 40 two family buildings (10.3%), 13 three family buildings (3.4%) and 8 multi-family buildings (or 2.1%). There were 362 (or 23.7%) persons who were part of a couple without children, and 919 (or 60.2%) who were part of a couple with children. There were 86 (or 5.6%) people who lived in single parent home, while there are 8 persons who were adult children living with one or both parents, 9 persons who lived in a household made up of relatives, 9 who lived in a household made up of unrelated persons, and 9 who are either institutionalized or live in another type of collective housing.

The vacancy rate for the municipality, in 2008, was 1.74%. As of 2007, the construction rate of new housing units was 2.4 new units per 1000 residents. In 2000 there were 628 apartments in the municipality. The most common apartment size was the 5 room apartment of which there were 191. There were 19 single room apartments and 162 apartments with six or more rooms. As of 2000 the average price to rent an average apartment in Basadingen-Schlattingen was 1182.87 Swiss francs (CHF) per month (US$950, £530, €760 approx. exchange rate from 2000). The average rate for a one-room apartment was 760.00 CHF (US$610, £340, €490), a two-room apartment was about 687.50 CHF (US$550, £310, €440), a three-room apartment was about 1193.71 CHF (US$950, £540, €760) and a six or more room apartment cost an average of 1380.44 CHF (US$1100, £620, €880). The average apartment price in Basadingen-Schlattingen was 106.0% of the national average of 1116 CHF.

In the 2007 federal election the most popular party was the SVP which received 55.28% of the vote. The next three most popular parties were the Green Party (11.25%), the SP (9.7%) and the CVP (9.01%). In the federal election, a total of 586 votes were cast, and the voter turnout was 52.0%.

The historical population is given in the following table:

| Year | Population Basadingen | Population Schlattingen |
|---|---|---|
| 1850 | 2,169 | 488 |
| 1900 | 1,885 | 333 |
| 1950 | 2,429 | 406 |
| 1980 | 2,049 | |
| 1990 | 2,574 | 512 |

== Economy ==
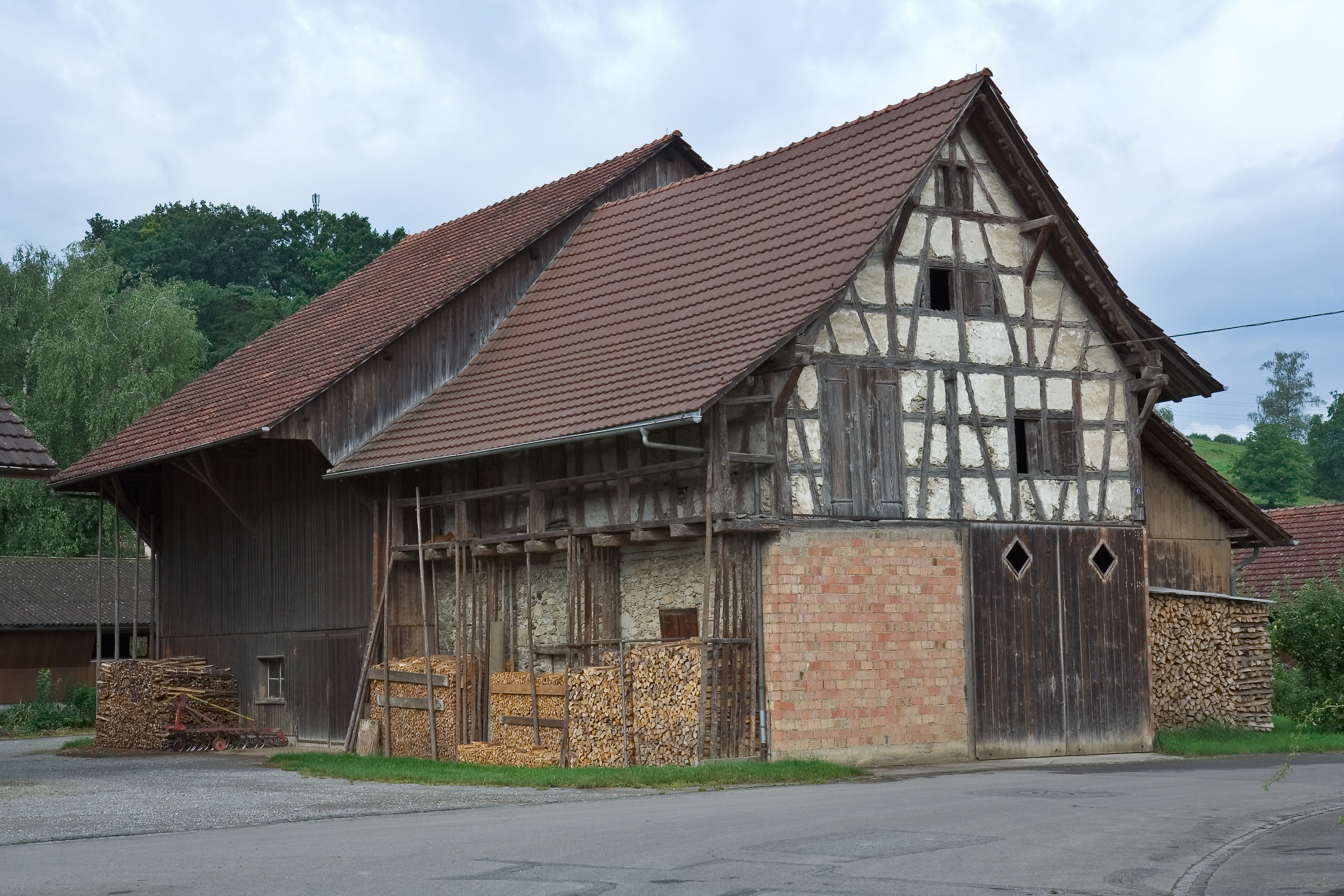
A barn in Schlattingen

As of 2007, Basadingen-Schlattingen had an unemployment rate of 1%. As of 2005, there were 186 people employed in the primary economic sector and about 53 businesses involved in this sector. 249 people are employed in the secondary sector and there are 32 businesses in this sector. 200 people are employed in the tertiary sector, with 40 businesses in this sector.

In 2000 there were 1,077 workers who lived in the municipality. Of these, 553 or about 51.3% of the residents worked outside Basadingen-Schlattingen while 286 people commuted into the municipality for work. There were a total of 810 jobs (of at least 6 hours per week) in the municipality. Of the working population, 11.8% used public transportation to get to work, and 49.6% used a private car.

== Religion ==
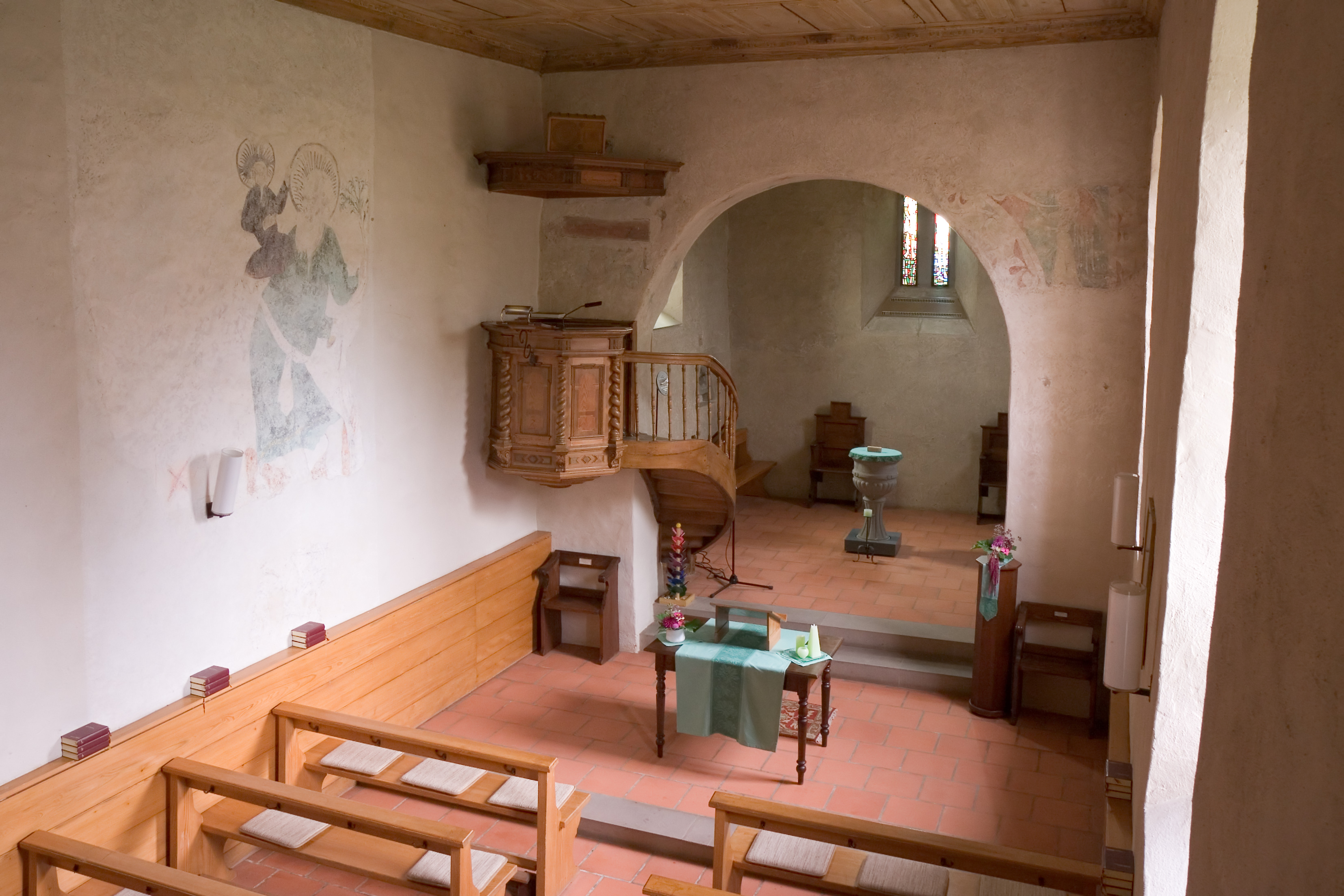
Church interior

From the 2000 census, 416 or 27.2% were Roman Catholic, while 765 or 50.1% belonged to the Swiss Reformed Church. Of the rest of the population, there are 4 individuals (or about 0.26% of the population) who belong to the Orthodox Church, and there are 53 individuals (or about 3.47% of the population) who belong to another Christian church. There were 51 (or about 3.34% of the population) who are Islamic. There are 5 individuals (or about 0.33% of the population) who belong to another church (not listed on the census), 155 (or about 10.15% of the population) belong to no church, are agnostic or atheist, and 78 individuals (or about 5.11% of the population) did not answer the question.

== Education ==
The entire Swiss population is generally well educated. In Basadingen-Schlattingen about 75.3% of the population (between age 25 and 64) have completed either non-mandatory upper secondary education or additional higher education (either university or a Fachhochschule).
