= Schlattingen =

Village in the canton of Thurgau, Switzerland

Coordinates: 47°40′N 8°45′E

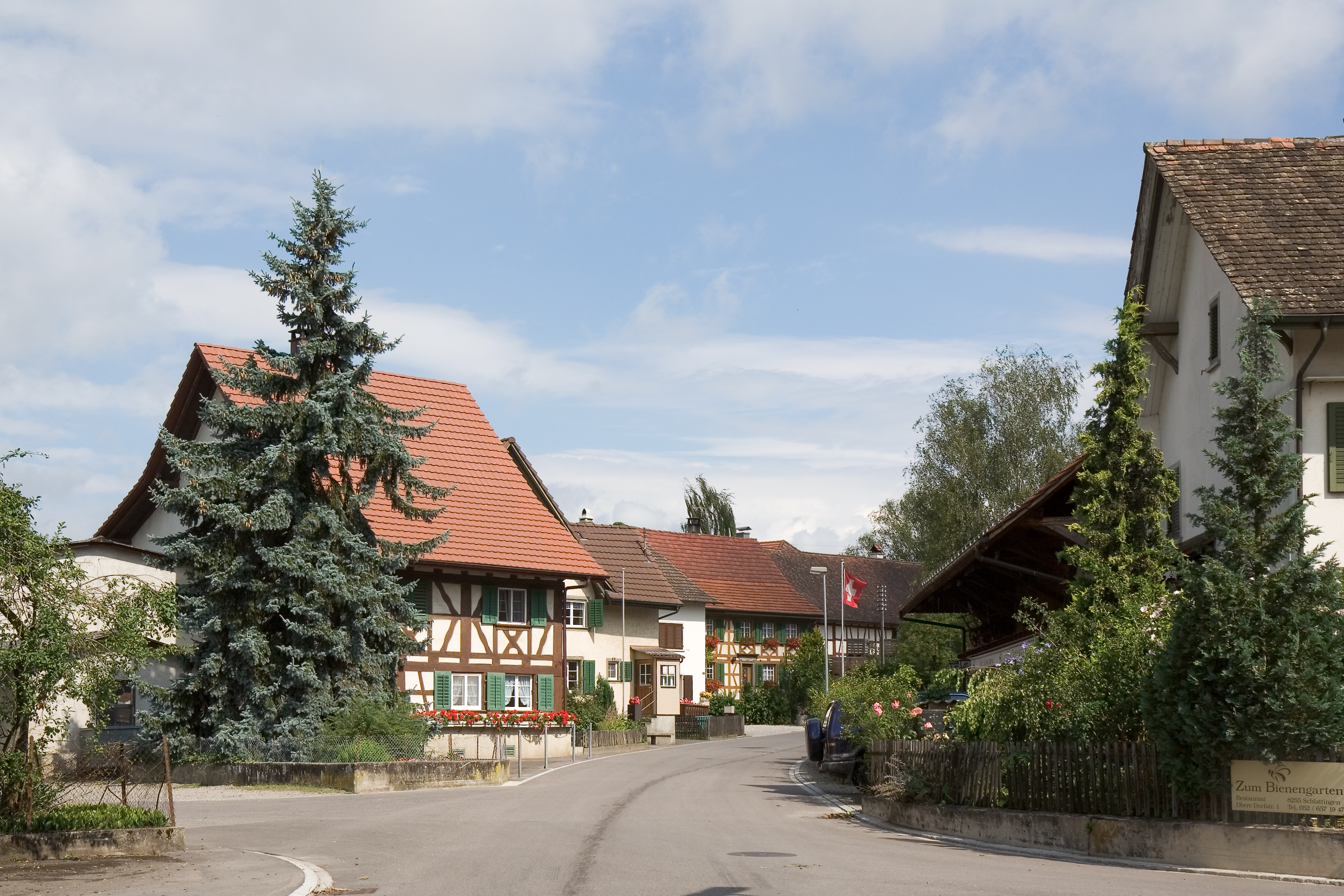
Village street in Schlattingen

Schlattingen is a village and former municipality in the canton of Thurgau, Switzerland.

In 1999 the municipality was merged with the neighboring municipality Basadingen to form a new and larger municipality Basadingen-Schlattingen.

== History ==
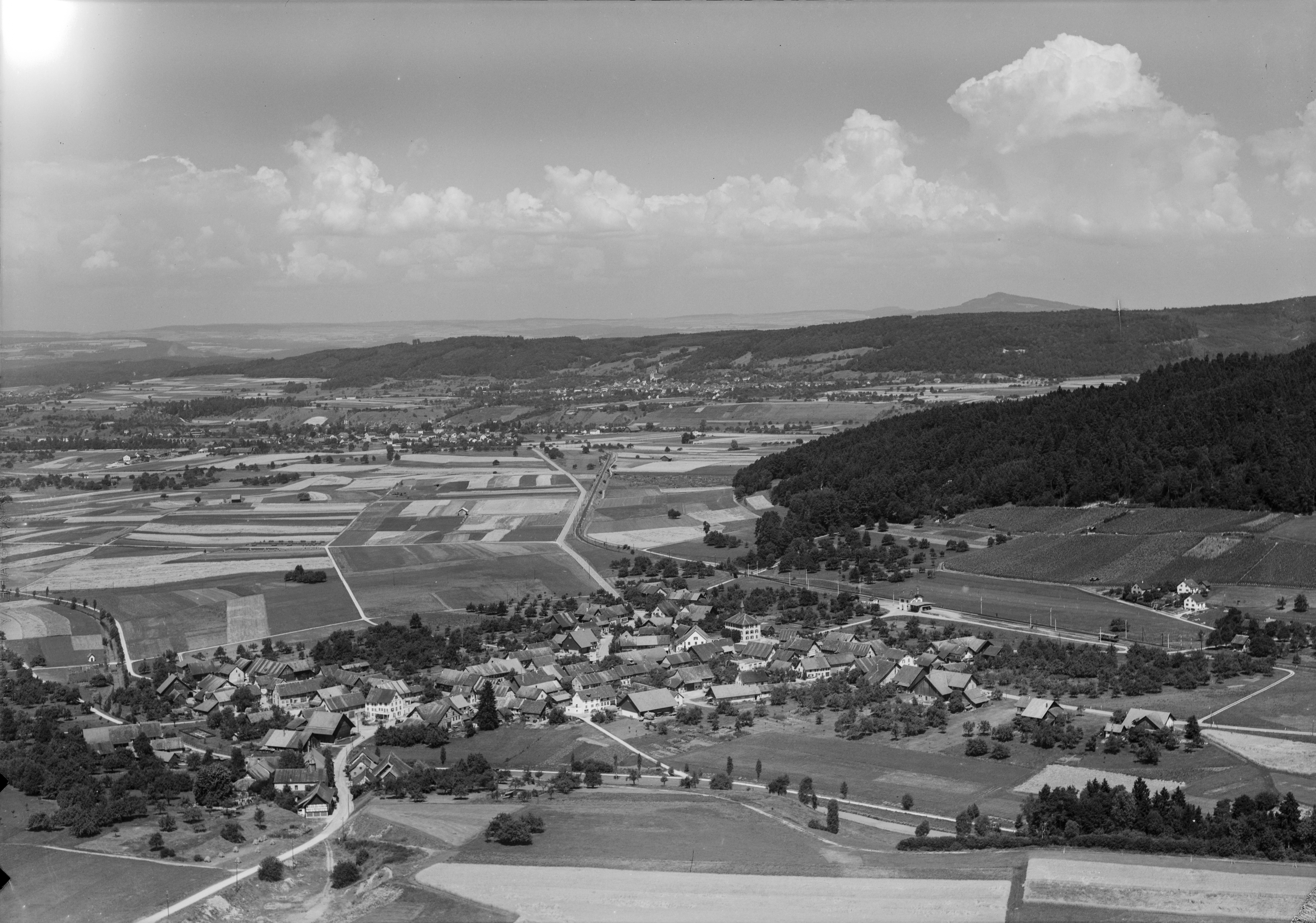
Aerial view (1954)

It was first mentioned in 897 as Slattingarro. Finds from the Paleolithic and Roman era indicate that there were earlier settlements in the area. In the Middle Ages the monasteries of St. Gallen, Münsterlingen, St. Katharinental and Wagenhausen all held property and rights in Schlattingen. The town of Diessenhofen held the low justice rights from 1489 to 1798 and the high justice rights after 1460.

The right to appoint pastors of the village church (built in 1275) was held by the Göberg family. Soon after the Protestant Reformation, it became part of the parish of Stammheim (today Oberstammheim and Unterstammheim) and remained so until 1827. The Diessenhofen parish staff gave the sermon after 1585 in Schlattingen. In 1827 the church of Schlattingen became a filial church of Basadingen.

In the 18th Century, the village acquired most of its own land and owned 259 acres (1.05 km^{2}) of woods. It produced grain, fruit, clover and grapes and in the 19th Century there was increased dairy farming. Between 1920 and 1980, the proportion of jobs in agriculture dropped from 72% to 46%, while the services sector saw an increase from 6% to 29%. A new housing development opened in 1945.

== Population ==
The population in 1850 was 488. By 1900 it had decreased to 333. In 1950 it was 406 and had increased to 512 in 1990.

== Transport ==
Schlattingen sits on the Lake Line between Schaffhausen and Rorschach and is served by the St. Gallen S-Bahn at the Schlattingen railway station, located at the northern edge of the city center.
