= Willisdorf =

Village in Thurgau, Switzerland

- Former municipality
- Willisdorf with the chapel of St. Sebastian
- Location of Willisdorf
- Location within Switzerland Location within Canton of Thurgau
- Coordinates: 47.6814°N 8.738°E
- Country: Switzerland
- Canton: Thurgau
- District: Frauenfeld
- Municipality: Diessenhofen

Population (1990)
  - Total: 343
- Time zone: UTC+01:00 (CET)
  - Summer (DST): UTC+02:00 (CEST)
- SFOS number: 4542
- ISO 3166 code: CH-TG
- Localities: Willisdorf, St. Katharinental
- Website

Willisdorf is a former Ortsgemeinde (local commune) in the canton of Thurgau, Switzerland. Since 2000 it has been part of the municipality of Diessenhofen, in the district of Frauenfeld.

== History ==
Willisdorf is first mentioned in 846 as Wilihdorf. Almost all the property that the Abbey of Saint Gall had owned in Willisdorf since the early Middle Ages was acquired after 1246 by the St. Katharinental monastery through purchases, exchanges and donations. In the Middle Ages high justice lay with the Kyburg and later Habsburg administrative district (Amt) of Diessenhofen. The town of Diessenhofen received high justice in 1460 and low justice in the 16th century, and exercised both until 1798.

In church matters Willisdorf always belonged to Basadingen, except for the Kundelfingerhof, whose Reformed inhabitants belonged to the parish of Schlatt, while its Catholic inhabitants were under the Paradies monastery. The chapel of St. Sebastian was probably built in the 12th or 13th century and was renovated from 1966 to 1971.

The inhabitants practiced arable farming, meadow farming and fruit growing. The mill at Kundelfingen, mentioned in 1263, existed until 1910. The mill in Willisdorf, also mentioned in 1263, has been run by the Bachmann family since 1857 and was electrified in 1948. The Rottmühle, mentioned in 1279, burned down in 1891. Besides lacquer manufacturers and a precision tools company, there has been a fish farm since 1910.

From 1812 to 1999 the Ortsgemeinde of Willisdorf, which included St. Katharinental, belonged to the Munizipalgemeinde (municipal commune) of Diessenhofen. Since 2000 Willisdorf has been part of the municipality of Diessenhofen, which belonged to Diessenhofen District until 2010. Willisdorf had 59 inhabitants in 1831, 180 in 1850, 557 in 1880, 475 in 1900, 528 in 1950 and 343 in 1990.

== Bibliography ==
- Die Kunstdenkmäler des Kantons Thurgau, 5, 1992, 305–316
