= Unterschlatt =

Village in Thurgau, Switzerland

- Former municipality
- Unterschlatt from the air in 1923
- Location of Unterschlatt
- Location within Switzerland Location within Canton of Thurgau
- Coordinates: 47.6628°N 8.704°E
- Country: Switzerland
- Canton: Thurgau
- District: Diessenhofen
- Municipality: Schlatt

Population (1990)
  - Total: 915
- Time zone: UTC+01:00 (CET)
  - Summer (DST): UTC+02:00 (CEST)
- SFOS number: 4534
- ISO 3166 code: CH-TG
- Localities: Dickihof, Unterschlatt, Paradies
- Website

Unterschlatt is a former Ortsgemeinde (local commune) in the canton of Thurgau, Switzerland. Since 1999 it has formed, together with Mett-Oberschlatt, the municipality of Schlatt. The former Ortsgemeinde, which comprised Dickihof, Unterschlatt and Paradies, lies between the Kohlfirst and the Buechberg and borders the Rhine.

== History ==
Unterschlatt is first mentioned in 1263 as in inferiori villa Slatthe. A Roman watchtower in the Schaarenwald on the Rhine was excavated in 1912 and has since been removed. In 1925 the remains of a villa rustica, a bronze bowl and a statuette of Mercury were found. The settlements of Schwarzach (Swarza) and Hierolteswilare existed in 875. The church of St. Peter in Schwarzach, mentioned in 1162, became part of the endowment of the Paradies monastery, which was newly built there after 1253.

In 858 Rheinau Abbey held lands and rights in Schlatt, around 1150 the monastery of Allerheiligen, and after 1250 also the monasteries of St. Katharinental and Paradies. Jurisdiction lay with the bailiff (Vogt) of Diessenhofen and, from 1460 to 1798, with the town of Diessenhofen.

A chapel in Unterschlatt is mentioned in 1162 and a priest in 1275. Later Unterschlatt came under the parish of Stammheim. A Reformed church was built in Unterschlatt in 1714, and a separate parish was created in 1769.

Alongside the three-field system, which was practiced until around 1800, fruit growing and market gardening were carried on, and a cheese dairy was established in the 19th century. From 1894 the Schaffhausen–Konstanz railway line made the industrial extraction of the clay beds easier (Keller-Ziegeleien AG brickworks, 1922).

The Ortsgemeinde existed from 1803. Until 1816 it belonged to the Munizipalgemeinde (municipal commune) of Diessenhofen, and from then until 1998 to the Munizipalgemeinde of Basadingen. Unterschlatt had 466 inhabitants in 1831, 631 in 1850, 633 in 1900, 914 in 1950 and 915 in 1990.

== Bibliography ==
- Die Kunstdenkmäler des Kantons Thurgau, 5, 1992, 254–283
- Hinweisinventar Thurgau: Schlatt, I, 2004 (Thurgau Cantonal Library)
- Archäologie im Thurgau, 2010, 220–221
