= Basadingen =

Village in the canton of Thurgau, Switzerland

Coordinates: 47°40′N 8°45′E

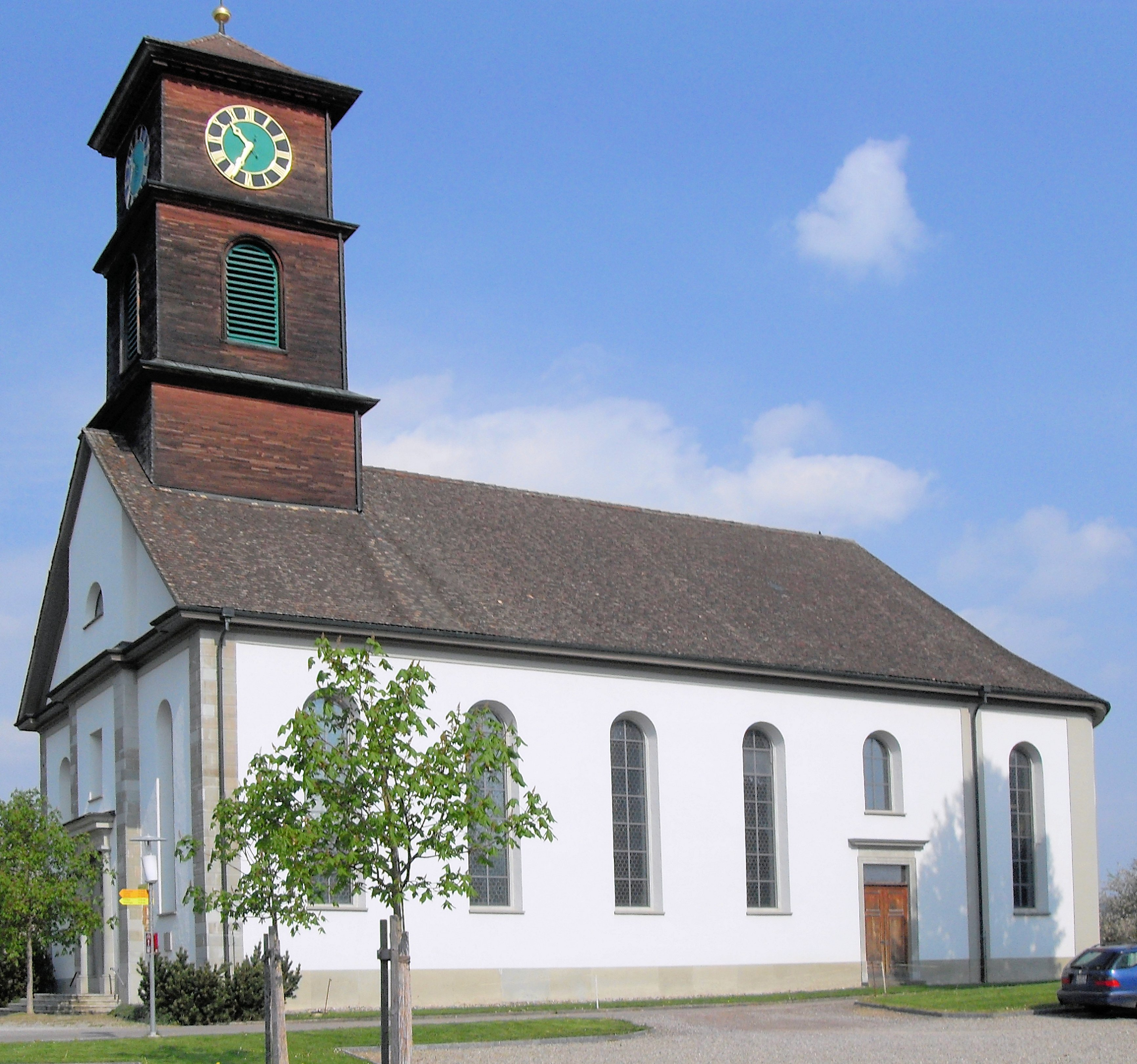
An Image of Basadingen

Basadingen is a village and former municipality in the canton of Thurgau, Switzerland.

In 1999, the municipality was merged with the neighboring municipality Schlattingen to form a new and larger municipality Basadingen-Schlattingen.

== History ==
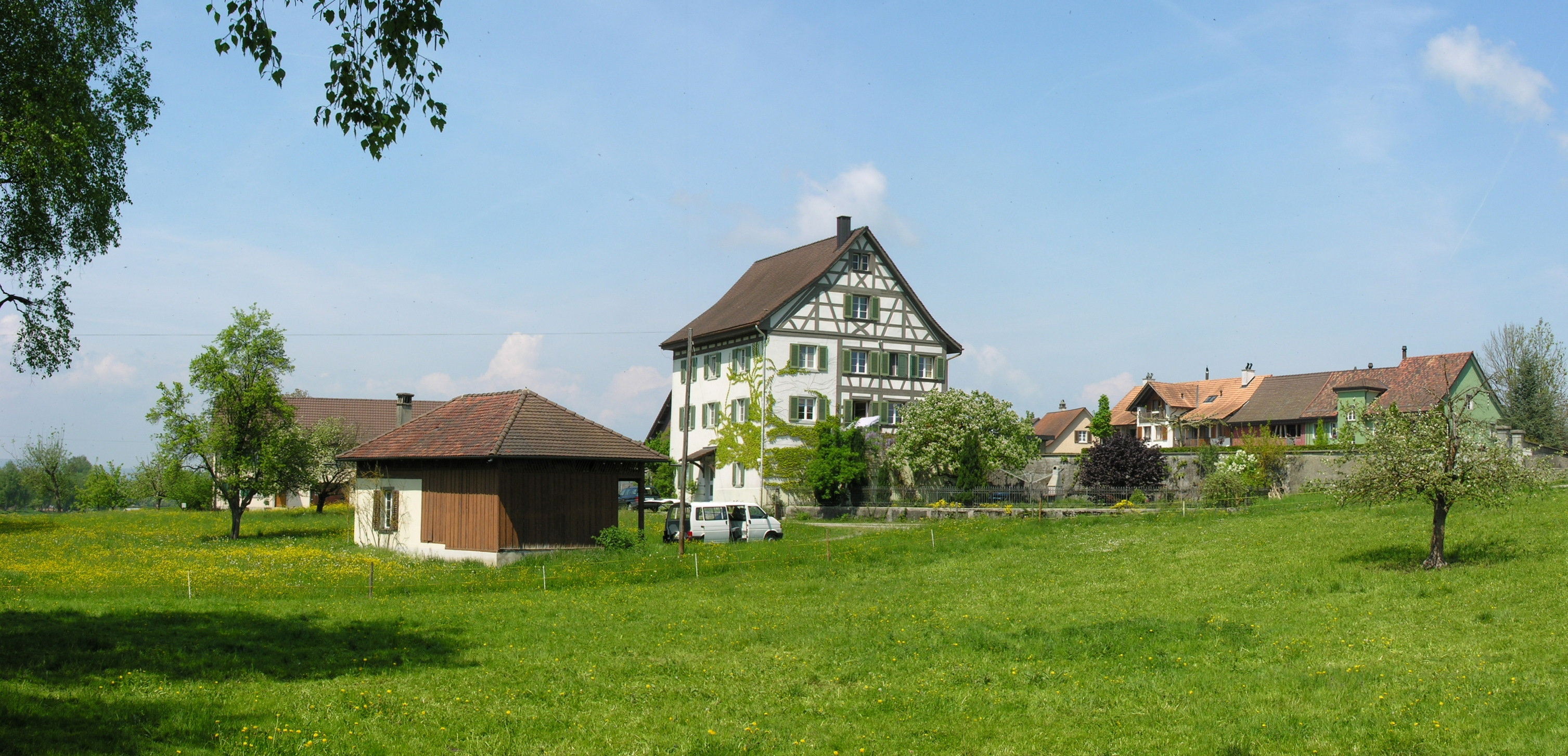
Basadingen

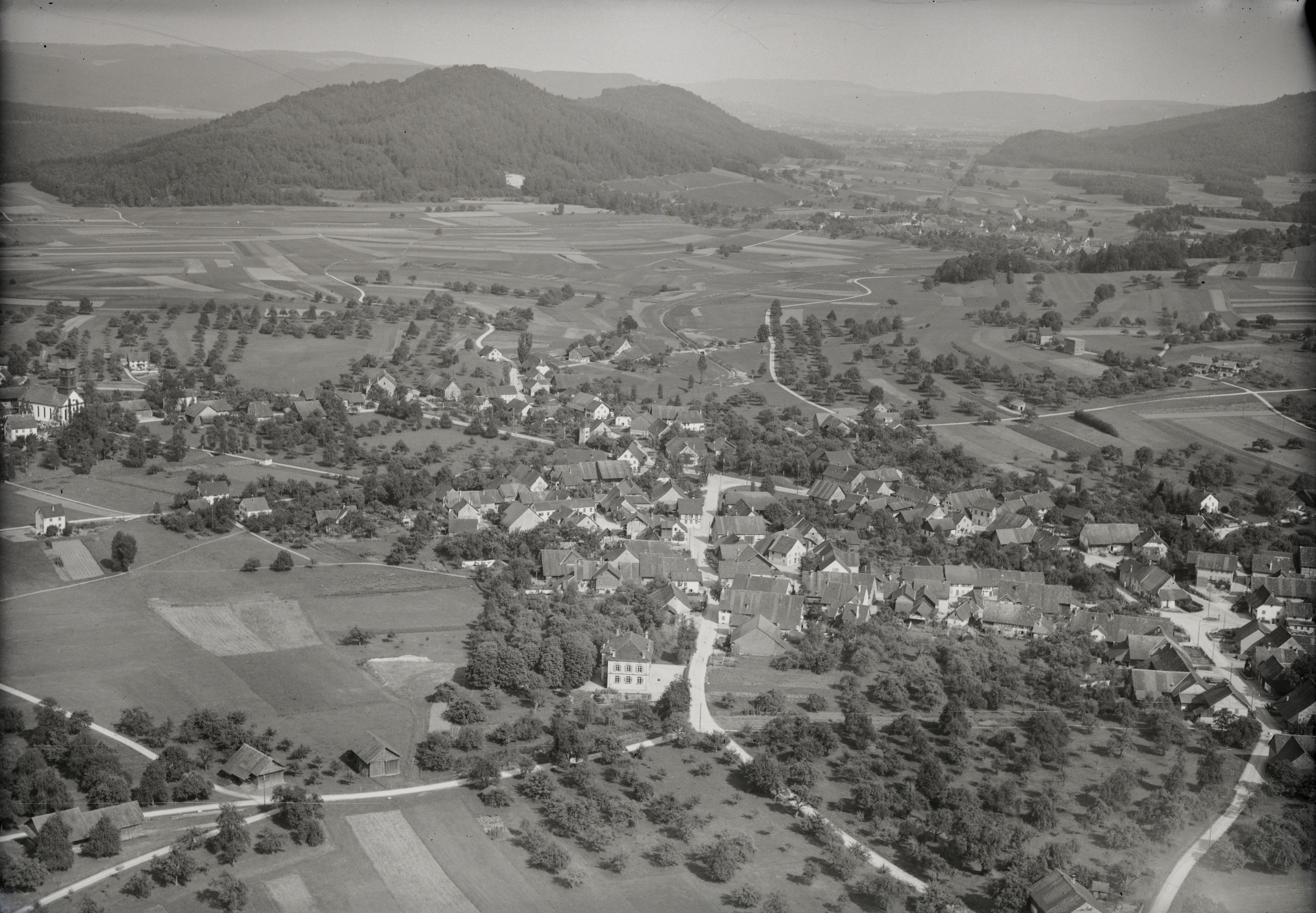
Aerial view (1947)

It was first recorded in year 761 as Pasnandingas. However, earlier evidence of settlements includes, finds from the Neolithic period (e.g. on the Buchberg and Dickihof), and a Roman villa with graves in Unterschlatt. In the Early Middle Ages, the monasteries of St. Gallen, Rheinau, Reichenau and Allerheiligen owned land in Basadingen. In 1260, the monastery of St. Katharinental bought Reichenau's Kehlhof (a farm owned by a monastery). By 1330, St. Katharinental had acquired many possessions in the village, as well as the low courts right and tithe rights. It became the sole landholder in the village. The high court rights were owned by the bailiwick of Diessenhofen by about 1300. In 1460, the high court transferred to the city of Diessenhofen, which also had the rights to the low court from 1527 until 1798.

During the High Middle Ages the village belonged partly to the parish of Stammheim (today Oberstammheim and Unterstammheim) and partly to the Basadingen parish, which was formed in the 13th Century when St. Martin's Church was built. In 1264, the church was brought under the authority of the monastery of St. Katharinental. After the Protestant Reformation in 1529, the parish of Basadingen and the Basadingen portion of the Stammheim parish, were merged into a new Basadingen parish, which also included the village of Willisdorf. In 1631, a Catholic parish was established, and St. Martin's Church became a shared church, a condition that remains even today. In 1845, the existing church was dedicated.

During the Middle Ages, the number of farms decreased from 40 in 1328 to only 16 in 1433, only to double again from 1470 to 1550. After that village population, land use and number of farms remained stable until 1800. In 1800, the number of farms rose sharply. Large forests also favored the expansion of the woodworking industry. In 1900, an embroidery factory and a brickyard offered some jobs, but the village retained a strong farming village character until around 1970. Since then, agricultural amelioration (mostly, relocation of fruit orchards) and a strong population growth has led to changes in the appearance and character of the village.

== Population ==
The municipality had 763 inhabitants in 1850, which went up and down to 662 in 1900, 792 in 1950, 681 in 1980, and 821 in 1990.
