= Diessenhofen District =

Coordinates: 47°41′N 8°45′E

Diessenhofen District Bezirk Diessenhofen
- District
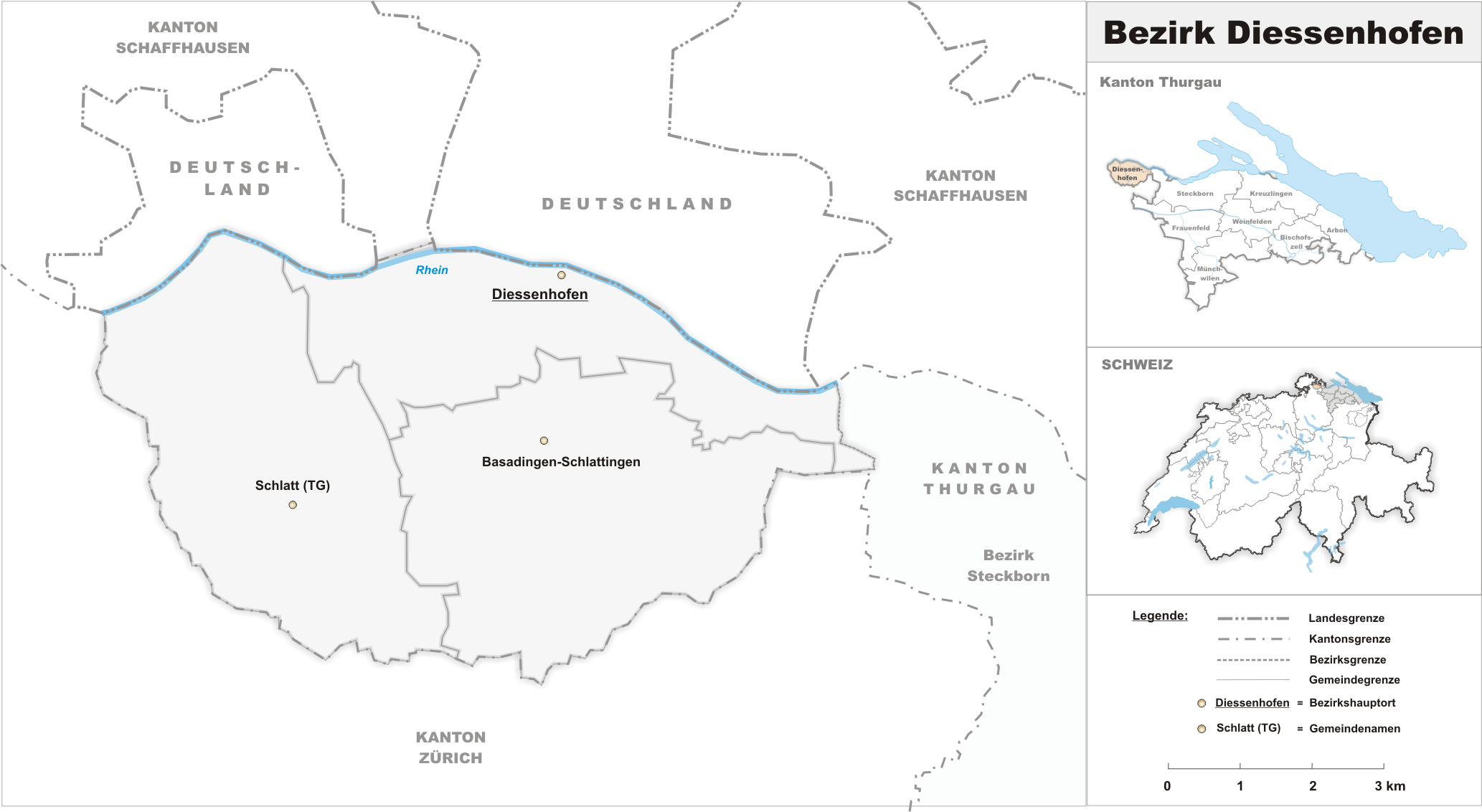
- Country: Switzerland
- Canton: Thurgau
- Capital: Diessenhofen

Area
  - Total: 41.2 km^{2} (15.9 sq mi)

Population (2009)
  - Total: 6,621
  - Density: 161/km^{2} (416/sq mi)
- Time zone: UTC+1 (CET)
  - Summer (DST): UTC+2 (CEST)
- Municipalities: 3

Diessenhofen District is a former district of the canton of Thurgau in Switzerland. It had a population of 6,621 (as of 2009). Its capital was the town of Diessenhofen.

The former district contained the following municipalities:

Coat of arms	Municipality	Population (31 December 2020)	Area km^{2}
Basadingen-Schlattingen	Basadingen-Schlattingen	1,818	15.7
Diessenhofen	Diessenhofen	4,085	10.0
Schlatt bei Diessenhofen	Schlatt bei Diessenhofen	1,814	15.5
	Total	6,621	41.2
