= St. Katharinental Monastery =

Former Dominican nunnery in Thurgau, Switzerland

- Kloster St. Katharinental
- Main entrance of the former monastery
- Interactive map of St. Katharinental Monastery

Monastery information
- Order: Dominican nuns
- Established: 1242
- Disestablished: 1869
- Dedication: Catherine of Alexandria
- Diocese: Constance (until 1815), Basel (from 1829)

Site
- Location: Diessenhofen, Thurgau, Switzerland
- Coordinates: 47.69145°N 8.737047°E

St. Katharinental Monastery (German: Kloster St. Katharinental) is a former monastery of Dominican nuns in the municipality of Diessenhofen in the canton of Thurgau, Switzerland. It belonged to the Diocese of Constance until 1815 and to the Diocese of Basel from 1829, and was dissolved in 1869. It grew out of a community of Beguines that moved from Winterthur to Diessenhofen in 1235, and in the 14th century, inspired by Henry Suso, it became a center of medieval mysticism. The canton of Thurgau set up a home for the sick and the elderly in the monastery building; in 1996 it was converted into a rehabilitation clinic.

== History ==
St. Katharinental is first mentioned in 1242 as Vallis sanctae Catherinae and in 1277 as Sant Katherinuntal. From 1245 to 1709 it belonged to the Dominican province of Teutonia, and from 1709 to 1809 to the province of Saxonia. Its patron saint was Catherine of Alexandria, and until 1735 also Nicholas of Myra.

Around 1230 Williburg von Hünikon formed a community of Beguines with a few women in Winterthur, which moved to Diessenhofen in 1235. In 1242 the community received a hunting lodge from Count Hartmann IV of Kyburg for the foundation of the monastery, and in 1245 a plot of land on the Rhine; in 1251 it moved into the first convent building. The women lived according to the Rule of Saint Augustine and the constitutions of the Dominicans of St. Mark's in Strasbourg. In 1245 Pope Innocent IV incorporated the monastery into the Order of Preachers. Albertus Magnus consecrated the altars of the church in 1267 and 1269. At first the monastery had a dozen women, around 1280 about 150, and later 40 to 70. The originally poor monastery prospered from 1260 through endowments, donations, dowries and acquisitions. Around 1380 it had assets of 5,000 marks of silver and scattered property in an area that extended from the Töss to north of the Randen near Schaffhausen and from Lake Constance to the Klettgau, as well as near Villingen (Baden). St. Katharinental exercised the low jurisdiction over Basadingen from 1260 to 1525, over Rudolfingen from 1260 to 1798 and over Ober-Gailingen (now in Baden-Württemberg) from 1282 to 1795. After 1264 the monastery depended on the protection of the Habsburg territorial lords. In 1418 St. Katharinental temporarily obtained imperial immediacy, and in 1432 it placed itself under the protection of the imperial knights of the Hegau. In 1460 the Confederates occupied the monastery during their campaign in the Thurgau.

Diessenhofen and the monastery (right), colored aquatint by Friedrich Salathé after Johann Ludwig Bleuler

The Dominicans of Constance provided pastoral care for the sisters. In the 14th century the monastery quickly reached a spiritual flowering and became known for its strict observance. Inspired by Henry Suso, it became a center of medieval mysticism, where outstanding works of art, among them the sculpted group of Christ and Saint John (Christus-Johannes-Gruppe), and manuscripts were produced. The manuscripts and codices, among them the gradual and the lives of the sisters, were mostly written in the monastery's own scriptorium, while the illuminations were by artists from Constance. During the Reformation the nuns resisted pressure from outside, and after the storming of the monastery (Klosterbruch) in 1529 they obtained protection from the council of Diessenhofen. In 1530 the women went into exile in Engen (Hegau), later in Villingen, and they returned to St. Katharinental in 1532, after the defeat of the Reformed side in the second battle of Kappel. The convent resisted the reform of the Council of Trent of 1563, as it did not want a stricter enclosure. Only the rebuilding of the monastery (1714–1718, 1734) and of the church (1732–1735), which the prioress Josepha Dominica von Rottenberg pushed through, created the conditions for a community that conformed to the rules of the order.

In 1798 the government of the Helvetic Republic confiscated the monastery's assets; this was the start of a long process of secularization. Only the Epavenrecht, under which the monastery's property in Baden would have fallen to the Grand Duchy of Baden, prevented its dissolution in 1848. A state treaty abolished this right in 1857, and in 1861 the government of Thurgau sold the Staffel forest (Staffelwald), which lay in Baden, to Baden. Nothing more stood in the way of the dissolution of St. Katharinental, and the people approved it in 1869 by adopting the new constitution of Thurgau. The same year the sisters moved to Schänis, and in 1906 to Weesen. The canton of Thurgau set up a home for the sick and the elderly (Kranken- und Greisenasyl) in the monastery building; it was renovated in 1973–1976 and converted into a rehabilitation clinic in 1996.

== Bibliography ==
- Das Graduale von St. Katharinenthal um 1312, 1983
- Die Kunstdenkmäler des Kantons Thurgau, 4, 1989
- V. Baumer-Müller, "Der letzte Konvent der Dominikanerinnen von St. Katharinental", in Thurgauer Beiträge zur Geschichte 131, 1994, pp. 5–140
- R. Meyer, Das "St. Katharinentaler Schwesternbuch", 1995
- Helvetia Sacra, IV/5, pp. 780–840
- Thurgauer Zeitung, 14 June and 8 July 2005
- C. Folini, Katharinental und Töss, 2007

=== Archives ===
- Staatsarchiv Thurgau
