= List of former municipalities of Switzerland =

This is a list of former municipalities of Switzerland, i.e. municipalities of Switzerland (German: Gemeinden, French: communes, Italian: comuni, Romansh: vischnancas) that no longer exist.

In 1850, Switzerland had 3203 municipalities. On 1 January 2026, the number was 2110.

== List ==
Name	Canton	Fate	Resulting municipality	Year
Aawangen	Thurgau	Incorporated into Aadorf	Aadorf	1996
Adlikon bei Andelfingen	Zürich	Incorporated into Andelfingen	Andelfingen	2023
Aeschlen bei Oberdiessbach	Bern	Incorporated into Oberdiessbach	Oberdiessbach	2010
Aetigkofen	Solothurn	Merged with Aetingen, Bibern, Brügglen, Gossliwil, Hessigkofen, Küttigkofen, Kyburg-Buchegg, Mühledorf and Tscheppach	Buchegg	2014
Aetingen	Solothurn	Merged with Aetigkofen, Bibern, Brügglen, Gossliwil, Hessigkofen, Küttigkofen, Kyburg-Buchegg, Mühledorf and Tscheppach	Buchegg	2014
Affoltern bei Zürich	Zürich	Incorporated into Zürich	Zürich	1934
Agra	Ticino	Merged with Gentilino and Montagnola	Collina d'Oro	2004
Agriswil	Fribourg	Incorporated into Ried bei Kerzers	Ried bei Kerzers	2006
Albeuve	Fribourg	Merged with Lessoc, Montbovon and Neirivue	Haut-Intyamon	2002
Albisrieden	Zürich	Incorporated into Zürich	Zürich	1934
Albligen	Bern	Merged with Wahlern	Schwarzenburg	2011
Alliswil	Aargau	Incorporated into Boniswil	Boniswil	1899
Almens	Grisons	Merged with Paspels, Pratval, Rodels and Tomils	Domleschg	2015
Alt St. Johann	St. Gallen	Merged with Wildhaus	Wildhaus-Alt St. Johann	2010
Altavilla	Fribourg	Incorporated into Murten	Murten	1991
Altdorf	Schaffhausen	Incorporated into Thayngen	Thayngen	2009
Altenburg	Aargau	Incorporated into Brugg	Brugg	1901
Alterswil	Fribourg	Incorporated into Tafers	Tafers	2021
Alterswilen	Thurgau	Merged with Altishausen, Dotnacht, Ellighausen, Hugelshofen, Lippoldswilen, Neuwilen and Siegershausen	Kemmental	1996
Altishausen	Thurgau	Merged with Alterswilen, Dotnacht, Ellighausen, Hugelshofen, Lippoldswilen, Neuwilen and Siegershausen	Kemmental	1996
Altstetten	Zürich	Incorporated into Zürich	Zürich	1934
Altwis	Lucerne	Incorporated into Hitzkirch	Hitzkirch	2021
Alvaneu	Grisons	Merged with Alvaschein, Brienz/Brinzauls, Mon, Stierva, Surava and Tiefencastel	Albula/Alvra	2015
Alvaschein	Grisons	Merged with Alvaneu, Brienz/Brinzauls, Mon, Stierva, Surava and Tiefencastel	Albula/Alvra	2015
Amlikon	Thurgau	Merged with Bissegg, Griesenberg and Strohwilen	Amlikon-Bissegg	1995
Ammannsegg	Solothurn	Merged with Lohn	Lohn-Ammannsegg	1993
Andhausen	Thurgau	Incorporated into Berg	Berg	1993
Andiast	Grisons	Incorporated into Breil/Brigels	Breil/Brigels	2018
Andwil	Thurgau	Incorporated into Birwinken	Birwinken	1995
Anetswil	Thurgau	Incorporated into Wängi	Wängi	1969
Anglikon	Aargau	Incorporated into Wohlen	Wohlen	1914
Anzonico	Ticino	Incorporated into Faido	Faido	2012
Apples	Vaud	Merged with Bussy-Chardonney, Cottens, Pampigny, Reverolle and Sévery	Hautemorges	2021
Aquila	Ticino	Merged with Campo Blenio, Ghirone, Olivone and Torre	Blenio	2006
Arconciel	Fribourg	Merged with Épendes and Senèdes	Bois-d'Amont	2021
Ardez	Grisons	Incorporated into Scuol	Scuol	2015
Areuse	Neuchâtel	Incorporated into Boudry	Boudry	1870
Arni-Islisberg	Aargau	Split in two	Arni; Islisberg	1983
Arosio	Ticino	Merged with Breno, Fescoggia, Mugena and Vezio	Alto Malcantone	2005
Arrissoules	Vaud	Incorporated into Rovray	Rovray	2005
Arrufens	Fribourg	Incorporated into Romont	Romont	1868
Arvigo	Grisons	Merged with Braggio, Cauco and Selma	Calanca	2015
Arzo	Ticino	Incorporated into Mendrisio	Mendrisio	2009
Astano	Ticino	Merged with Bedigliora, Curio, Miglieglia and Novaggio	Lema	2025
Asuel	Jura	Merged with Charmoille, Fregiécourt, Miécourt and Pleujouse	La Baroche	2009
Attelwil	Aargau	Incorporated into Reitnau	Reitnau	2019
Au	Thurgau	Incorporated into Fischingen	Fischingen	1972
Auboranges	Fribourg	Incorporated into Rue	Rue	2025
Augio	Grisons	Incorporated into Rossa	Rossa	1982
Aumont	Fribourg	Merged with Frasses, Granges-de-Vesin and Montet	Les Montets	2004
Auressio	Ticino	Merged with Berzona and Loco	Isorno	2001
Aurigeno	Ticino	Incorporated into Maggia	Maggia	2004
Ausserbinn	Valais	Incorporated into Ernen	Ernen	2004
Ausserbirrmoos	Bern	Merged with Innerbirrmoos and Otterbach	Linden	1946
Ausserferrera	Grisons	Merged with Innerferrera	Ferrera	2008
Aussersihl	Zürich	Incorporated into Zürich	Zürich	1893
Autafond	Fribourg	Incorporated into Belfaux	Belfaux	2016
Autavaux	Fribourg	Merged with Forel and Montbrelloz	Vernay	2006
Auvernier	Neuchâtel	Merged with Bôle and Colombier	Milvignes	2013
Avegno	Ticino	Merged with Gordevio	Avegno Gordevio	2008
Avry-devant-Pont	Fribourg	Merged with Gumefens and Le Bry	Pont-en-Ogoz	2003
Avry-sur-Matran	Fribourg	Merged with Corjolens	Avry	2001
Ayer	Valais	Merged with Chandolin, Grimentz, Saint-Jean, Saint-Luc and Vissoie	Anniviers	2009
Bad Zurzach	Aargau	Merged with Baldingen, Böbikon, Kaiserstuhl, Rekingen, Rietheim, Rümikon and Wislikofen	Zurzach	2022
Bagnes	Valais	Merged with Vollèges	Val de Bagnes	2021
Baldingen	Aargau	Merged with Bad Zurzach, Böbikon, Kaiserstuhl, Rekingen, Rietheim, Rümikon and Wislikofen	Zurzach	2022
Ballmoos	Bern	Incorporated into Jegenstorf	Jegenstorf	2010
Balm bei Messen	Solothurn	Incorporated into Messen	Messen	2010
Balterswil	Thurgau	Merged with Bichelsee	Bichelsee-Balterswil	1996
Balzenwil	Aargau	Merged with Riken	Murgenthal	1901
Bangerten	Bern	Incorporated into Rapperswil	Rapperswil	2016
Barbengo	Ticino	Incorporated into Lugano	Lugano	2008
Barberêche	Fribourg	Incorporated into Courtepin	Courtepin	2017
Barschwand	Bern	Incorporated into Ausserbirrmoos	Ausserbirrmoos	1888
Barzheim	Schaffhausen	Incorporated into Thayngen	Thayngen	2004
Bas-Vully	Fribourg	Merged with Haut-Vully	Mont-Vully	2016
Basadingen	Thurgau	Merged with Schlattingen	Basadingen-Schlattingen	1999
Bassecourt	Jura	Merged with Courfaivre, Glovelier, Soulce and Undervelier	Haute-Sorne	2013
Bauen	Uri	Incorporated into Seedorf	Seedorf	2021
Bedigliora	Ticino	Merged with Astano, Curio, Miglieglia and Novaggio	Lema	2025
Bellerive	Vaud	Merged with Chabrey, Constantine, Montmagny, Mur, Vallamand and Villars-le-Grand	Vully-les-Lacs	2011
Belpberg	Bern	Incorporated into Belp	Belp	2012
Benken	Basel-Country	Merged with Biel	Biel-Benken	1972
Benzenschwil	Aargau	Incorporated into Merenschwand	Merenschwand	2012
Bergün/Bravuogn	Grisons	Merged with Filisur	Bergün Filisur	2018
Beride	Ticino	Merged with Biogno	Biogno-Beride	1907
Berlens	Fribourg	Incorporated into Mézières	Mézières	2004
Bernex-Onex-Confignon	Geneva	Split in two	Bernex; Onex-Confignon	1850
Bertschikon bei Attikon	Zürich	Incorporated into Wiesendangen	Wiesendangen	2014
Berzona	Ticino	Merged with Auressio and Loco	Isorno	2001
Besazio	Ticino	Incorporated into Mendrisio	Mendrisio	2013
Besencens	Fribourg	Incorporated into Saint-Martin	Saint-Martin	2004
Betschwanden	Glarus	Merged with Braunwald, Elm, Engi, Haslen, Linthal, Luchsingen, Matt, Mitlödi, Rüti, Schwanden, Schwändi and Sool	Glarus Süd	2011
Betten	Valais	Merged with Martisberg	Bettmeralp	2014
Beurnevésin	Jura	Merged with Bonfol	Basse-Vendline	2024
Bevaix	Neuchâtel	Merged with Fresens, Gorgier, Montalchez, Saint-Aubin-Sauges and Vaumarcus	La Grande Béroche	2018
Bévilard	Bern	Merged with Malleray and Pontenet	Valbirse	2015
Bibern	Schaffhausen	Incorporated into Thayngen	Thayngen	2009
Bibern	Solothurn	Merged with Aetigkofen, Aetingen, Brügglen, Gossliwil, Hessigkofen, Küttigkofen, Kyburg-Buchegg, Mühledorf and Tscheppach	Buchegg	2014
Bichelsee	Thurgau	Merged with Balterswil	Bichelsee-Balterswil	1996
Bickigen-Schwanden	Bern	Incorporated into Wynigen	Wynigen	1911
Bidogno	Ticino	Incorporated into Capriasca	Capriasca	2008
Biel	Basel-Country	Merged with Benken	Biel-Benken	1972
Biel	Valais	Merged with Ritzingen and Selkingen	Grafschaft	2000
Biessenhofen	Thurgau	Incorporated into Amriswil	Amriswil	1979
Bignasco	Ticino	Incorporated into Cevio	Cevio	2006
Billens	Fribourg	Merged with Hennens	Billens-Hennens	1998
Bilten	Glarus	Merged with Filzbach, Mollis, Mühlehorn, Näfels, Niederurnen, Oberurnen and Obstalden	Glarus Nord	2011
Biogno	Ticino	Merged with Beride	Biogno-Beride	1907
Biogno	Ticino	Split in two	Breganzona; Bioggio	1925
Biogno-Beride	Ticino	Merged with Croglio-Castelrotto	Croglio	1976
Bioley-Orjulaz	Vaud	Incorporated into Assens	Assens	2021
Bionnens	Fribourg	Incorporated into Ursy	Ursy	2001
Birgisch	Valais	Incorporated into Naters	Naters	2013
Bironico	Ticino	Merged with Camignolo, Medeglia, Rivera and Sigirino	Monteceneri	2010
Bissegg	Thurgau	Merged with Amlikon, Griesenberg and Strohwilen	Amlikon-Bissegg	1995
Bivio	Grisons	Merged with Cunter, Marmorera, Mulegns, Riom-Parsonz, Salouf, Savognin, Sur and Tinizong-Rona	Surses	2016
Bleiken	Thurgau	Incorporated into Sulgen	Sulgen	1964
Bleiken bei Oberdiessbach	Bern	Incorporated into Oberdiessbach	Oberdiessbach	2014
Blessens	Fribourg	Incorporated into Rue	Rue	1993
Blitzingen	Valais	Merged with Grafschaft, Münster-Geschinen, Niederwald and Reckingen-Gluringen	Goms	2017
Blonay	Vaud	Merged with Saint-Légier-La Chiésaz	Blonay – Saint-Légier	2022
Böbikon	Aargau	Merged with Bad Zurzach, Baldingen, Kaiserstuhl, Rekingen, Rietheim, Rümikon and Wislikofen	Zurzach	2022
Bodio	Ticino	Incorporated into Giornico	Giornico	2025
Bogno	Ticino	Incorporated into Lugano	Lugano	2013
Bôle	Neuchâtel	Merged with Auvernier and Colombier	Milvignes	2013
Bollion	Fribourg	Incorporated into Lully	Lully	2006
Bollodingen	Bern	Incorporated into Bettenhausen	Bettenhausen	2011
Bonau	Thurgau	Incorporated into Wigoltingen	Wigoltingen	1995
Bondo	Grisons	Merged with Castasegna, Soglio, Stampa and Vicosoprano	Bregaglia	2010
Bonfol	Jura	Merged with Beurnevésin	Basse-Vendline	2024
Bonnefontaine	Fribourg	Merged with Essert, Montévraz, Oberried, Praroman and Zénauva	Le Mouret	2003
Borgnone	Ticino	Merged with Intragna and Palagnedra	Centovalli	2009
Bosco Luganese	Ticino	Incorporated into Bioggio	Bioggio	2004
Boudevilliers	Neuchâtel	Merged with Cernier, Chézard-Saint-Martin, Coffrane, Dombresson, Engollon, Fenin-Vilars-Saules, Fontainemelon, Fontaines, Le Pâquier, Les Geneveys-sur-Coffrane, Les Hauts-Geneveys, Montmollin, Savagnier and Villiers	Val-de-Ruz	2013
Bouloz	Fribourg	Merged with Pont, Veveyse and Porsel	Le Flon	2004
Boveresse	Neuchâtel	Merged with Buttes, Couvet, Fleurier, Les Bayards, Môtiers, Noiraigue, Saint-Sulpice and Travers	Val-de-Travers	2009
Bözberg	Aargau	Split in two	Oberbözberg; Unterbözberg	1873
Bözen	Aargau	Merged with Effingen, Elfingen and Hornussen	Böztal	2022
Bözingen	Bern	Incorporated into Biel/Bienne	Biel/Bienne	1917
Braggio	Grisons	Merged with Arvigo, Cauco and Selma	Calanca	2015
Bramois	Valais	Incorporated into Sion	Sion	1968
Bratsch	Valais	Merged with Gampel	Gampel-Bratsch	2009
Braunwald	Glarus	Merged with Betschwanden, Elm, Engi, Haslen, Linthal, Luchsingen, Matt, Mitlödi, Rüti, Schwanden, Schwändi and Sool	Glarus Süd	2011
Brè-Aldesago	Ticino	Incorporated into Lugano	Lugano	1972
Brechershäusern	Bern	Incorporated into Wynigen	Wynigen	1887
Breganzona	Ticino	Incorporated into Lugano	Lugano	2004
Bremgarten Stadtgericht	Bern	Incorporated into Kirchlindach	Kirchlindach	1880
Brenles	Vaud	Incorporated into Lucens	Lucens	2017
Breno	Ticino	Merged with Arosio, Fescoggia, Mugena and Vezio	Alto Malcantone	2005
Bressaucourt	Jura	Incorporated into Fontenais	Fontenais	2013
Brienz	Grisons	Merged with Surava	Brienz-Surava	1869
Brienz/Brinzauls	Grisons	Merged with Alvaneu, Alvaschein, Mon, Stierva, Surava and Tiefencastel	Albula/Alvra	2015
Brienz-Surava	Grisons	Split in two	Brienz; Surava	1883
Brig	Valais	Merged with Brigerbad and Glis	Brig-Glis	1972
Brigerbad	Valais	Merged with Brig and Glis	Brig-Glis	1972
Brione	Ticino	Merged with Corippo, Cugnasco-Gerra (Gerra Valle), Frasco, Lavertezzo (Lavertezzo Valle), Sonogno and Vogorno	Verzasca	2020
Brione-Gerra	Ticino	Split in two	Brione; Gerra	1852
Broglio	Ticino	Merged with Brontallo, Fusio, Menzonio, Peccia and Prato-Sornico	Lavizzara	2004
Bronschhofen	St. Gallen	Incorporated into Wil	Wil	2013
Brontallo	Ticino	Merged with Broglio, Fusio, Menzonio, Peccia and Prato-Sornico	Lavizzara	2004
Brot-Dessous	Neuchâtel	Incorporated into Rochefort	Rochefort	2016
Brot-Dessus	Neuchâtel	Merged with Plamboz	Brot-Plamboz	1875
Brügglen	Solothurn	Merged with Aetigkofen, Aetingen, Bibern, Gossliwil, Hessigkofen, Küttigkofen, Kyburg-Buchegg, Mühledorf and Tscheppach	Buchegg	2014
Brunnadern	St. Gallen	Merged with Mogelsberg and St. Peterzell	Neckertal	2009
Brunnenthal	Solothurn	Incorporated into Messen	Messen	2010
Bruzella	Ticino	Merged with Cabbio, Caneggio, Morbio Superiore, Muggio and Sagno	Breggia	2009
Büblikon	Aargau	Incorporated into Wohlenschwil	Wohlenschwil	1906
Buch bei Frauenfeld	Thurgau	Merged with Uesslingen	Uesslingen-Buch	1995
Buch bei Märwil	Thurgau	Incorporated into Affeltrangen	Affeltrangen	1995
Buchackern	Thurgau	Incorporated into Erlen	Erlen	1995
Buchen	Grisons	Incorporated into Luzein	Luzein	1872
Buchs	Lucerne	Incorporated into Dagmersellen	Dagmersellen	2006
Büchslen	Fribourg	Incorporated into Murten	Murten	2013
Buchthalen	Schaffhausen	Incorporated into Schaffhausen	Schaffhausen	1947
Buhwil	Thurgau	Merged with Kradolf, Neukirch an der Thur and Schönenberg an der Thur	Kradolf-Schönenberg	1996
Buix	Jura	Merged with Courtemaîche and Montignez	Basse-Allaine	2009
Bümpliz	Bern	Incorporated into Bern	Bern	1919
Büren	Nidwalden	Split in two	Oberdorf Wolfenschiessen	1850
Büren zum Hof	Bern	Incorporated into Fraubrunnen	Fraubrunnen	2014
Burg	Aargau	Incorporated into Menziken	Menziken	2023
Burg bei Murten	Fribourg	Incorporated into Murten	Murten	1975
Burgäschi	Solothurn	Incorporated into Aeschi	Aeschi	1994
Bussigny-sur-Oron	Vaud	Merged with Châtillens, Chesalles-sur-Oron, Écoteaux, Les Tavernes, Les Thioleyres, Oron-la-Ville, Oron-le-Châtel, Palézieux and Vuibroye	Oron	2012
Busswil	Thurgau	Incorporated into Sirnach	Sirnach	1997
Busswil bei Büren	Bern	Incorporated into Lyss	Lyss	2011
Bussy	Fribourg	Merged with Estavayer-le-Lac, Morens, Murist, Rueyres-les-Prés, Vernay and Vuissens	Estavayer	2017
Bussy-Chardonney	Vaud	Merged with Apples, Cottens, Pampigny, Reverolle and Sévery	Hautemorges	2021
Bussy-sur-Morges	Vaud	Merged with Chardonney-sur-Morges	Bussy-Chardonney	1961
Bütschwil	St. Gallen	Merged with Ganterschwil	Bütschwil-Ganterschwil	2013
Buttes	Neuchâtel	Merged with Boveresse, Couvet, Fleurier, Les Bayards, Môtiers, Noiraigue, Saint-Sulpice and Travers	Val-de-Travers	2009
Cabbio	Ticino	Merged with Bruzella, Caneggio, Morbio Superiore, Muggio and Sagno	Breggia	2009
Cadro	Ticino	Incorporated into Lugano	Lugano	2013
Cagiallo	Ticino	Merged with Lopagno, Roveredo, Sala Capriasca, Tesserete and Vaglio	Capriasca	2001
Calfreisen	Grisons	Incorporated into Arosa	Arosa	2013
Calonico	Ticino	Incorporated into Faido	Faido	2006
Calpiogna	Ticino	Incorporated into Faido	Faido	2012
Camignolo	Ticino	Merged with Bironico, Medeglia, Rivera, Sigirino	Monteceneri	2010
Camorino	Ticino	Incorporated into Bellinzona	Bellinzona	2017
Campello	Ticino	Incorporated into Faido	Faido	2012
Campestro	Ticino	Incorporated into Tesserete	Tesserete	1976
Campo-Blenio	Ticino	Merged with Aquila, Ghirone, Olivone and Torre	Blenio	2006
Camuns	Grisons	Merged with Surcasti, Tersnaus and Uors-Peiden	Suraua	2002
Caneggio	Ticino	Merged with Bruzella, Cabbio, Morbio Superiore, Muggio and Sagno	Breggia	2009
Capolago	Ticino	Incorporated into Mendrisio	Mendrisio	2009
Carabbia	Ticino	Incorporated into Lugano	Lugano	2008
Carabietta	Ticino	Incorporated into Collina d'Oro	Collina d'Oro	2012
Carasso	Ticino	Incorporated into Bellinzona	Bellinzona	1907
Carona	Ticino	Incorporated into Lugano	Lugano	2013
Carrouge	Vaud	Merged with Ferlens and Mézières	Jorat-Mézières	2016
Casaccia	Grisons	Incorporated into Vicosoprano	Vicosoprano	1971
Casenzano	Ticino	Merged with Vairano	San Nazzaro	1930
Casima	Ticino	Incorporated into Castel San Pietro	Castel San Pietro	2004
Castagnola	Ticino	Incorporated into Lugano	Lugano	1972
Castasegna	Grisons	Merged with Bondo, Soglio, Stampa and Vicosoprano	Bregaglia	2010
Casti	Grisons	Merged with Wergenstein	Casti-Wergenstein	1923
Casti-Wergenstein	Grisons	Merged with Donat, Lohn and Mathon	Muntogna da Schons	2021
Castiel	Grisons	Incorporated into Arosa	Arosa	2013
Castrisch	Grisons	Merged with Duvin, Ilanz, Ladir, Luven, Pigniu, Pitasch, Riein, Rueun, Ruschein, Schnaus, Sevgein and Siat	Ilanz/Glion	2014
Castro	Ticino	Merged with Corzoneso, Dongio, Largario, Leontica, Lottigna, Marolta, Ponto Valentino and Prugiasco	Acquarossa	2004
Cauco	Grisons	Merged with Arvigo, Braggio and Selma	Calanca	2015
Cavadura	Grisons	Incorporated into Grüsch	Grüsch	1875
Cavagnago	Ticino	Incorporated into Faido	Faido	2012
Cavergno	Ticino	Incorporated into Cevio	Cevio	2006
Caviano	Ticino	Merged with Contone, Gerra, Indemini, Magadino, Piazzogna, San Nazzaro, Sant'Abbondio and Vira	Gambarogno	2010
Cavigliano	Ticino	Merged with Tegna and Verscio	Terre di Pedemonte	2013
Cerniat	Fribourg	Merged with Charmey	Val-de-Charmey	2014
Cerniaz	Vaud	Merged with Combremont-le-Grand, Combremont-le-Petit, Granges-près-Marnand, Marnand, Sassel, Seigneux and Villars-Bramard	Valbroye	2011
Cernier	Neuchâtel	Merged with Boudevilliers, Chézard-Saint-Martin, Coffrane, Dombresson, Engollon, Fenin-Vilars-Saules, Fontainemelon, Fontaines, Le Pâquier, Les Geneveys-sur-Coffrane, Les Hauts-Geneveys, Montmollin, Savagnier and Villiers	Val-de-Ruz	2013
Certara	Ticino	Incorporated into Lugano	Lugano	2013
Châbles	Fribourg	Merged with Cheyres	Cheyres-Châbles	2017
Chabrey	Vaud	Merged with Bellerive, Constantine, Montmagny, Mur, Vallamand and Villars-le-Grand	Vully-les-Lacs	2011
Champmartin	Vaud	Incorporated into Cudrefin	Cudrefin	2002
Chandolin	Valais	Merged with Ayer, Grimentz, Saint-Jean, Saint-Luc and Vissoie	Anniviers	2009
Chandon	Fribourg	Incorporated into Léchelles	Léchelles	1994
Chandossel	Fribourg	Incorporated into Villarepos	Villarepos	1983
Chanéaz	Vaud	Merged with Chapelle-sur-Moudon, Correvon, Denezy, Martherenges, Neyruz-sur-Moudon, Peyres-Possens, Saint-Cierges and Thierrens	Montanaire	2013
Chapelle	Fribourg	Incorporated into Cheiry	Cheiry	2005
Chapelle	Fribourg	Incorporated into Rue	Rue	2025
Chapelle-sur-Moudon	Vaud	Merged with Chanéaz, Correvon, Denezy, Martherenges, Neyruz-sur-Moudon, Peyres-Possens, Saint-Cierges and Thierrens	Montanaire	2013
Chardonney-sur-Morges	Vaud	Merged with Bussy-sur-Morges	Bussy-Chardonney	1961
Charmey	Fribourg	Merged with Cerniat	Val-de-Charmey	2014
Charmoille	Jura	Merged with Asuel, Fregiécourt, Miécourt and Pleujouse	La Baroche	2009
Charrat	Valais	Incorporated into Martigny	Martigny	2021
Châtelat	Bern	Merged with Monible, Sornetan and Souboz	Petit-Val	2015
Châtillens	Vaud	Merged with Bussigny-sur-Oron, Chesalles-sur-Oron, Écoteaux, Les Tavernes, Les Thioleyres, Oron-la-Ville, Oron-le-Châtel, Palézieux and Vuibroye	Oron	2012
Chavannes-les-Forts	Fribourg	Incorporated into Siviriez	Siviriez	2004
Chavannes-sous-Orsonnens	Fribourg	Merged with Orsonnens, Villargiroud and Villarsiviriaux	Villorsonnens	2001
Cheiry	Fribourg	Incorporated into Surpierre	Surpierre	2021
Chêne-Thônex	Geneva	Split in two	Chêne-Bourg; Thônex	1869
Chermignon	Valais	Merged with Mollens, Montana and Randogne	Crans-Montana	2017
Chésalles	Fribourg	Incorporated into Marly	Marly	1976
Chesalles-sur-Moudon	Vaud	Incorporated into Lucens	Lucens	2017
Chesalles-sur-Oron	Vaud	Merged with Bussigny-sur-Oron, Châtillens, Écoteaux, Les Tavernes, Les Thioleyres, Oron-la-Ville, Oron-le-Châtel, Palézieux and Vuibroye	Oron	2012
Chésopelloz	Fribourg	Incorporated into Corminboeuf	Corminboeuf	2017
Chevenez	Jura	Merged with Damvant, Réclère and Roche-d'Or	Haute-Ajoie	2009
Cheyres	Fribourg	Merged with Châbles	Cheyres-Châbles	2017
Chézard-Saint-Martin	Neuchâtel	Merged with Boudevilliers, Cernier, Coffrane, Dombresson, Engollon, Fenin-Vilars-Saules, Fontainemelon, Fontaines, Le Pâquier, Les Geneveys-sur-Coffrane, Les Hauts-Geneveys, Montmollin, Savagnier and Villiers	Val-de-Ruz	2013
Chiggiogna	Ticino	Incorporated into Faido	Faido	2006
Chironico	Ticino	Incorporated into Faido	Faido	2012
Cimadera	Ticino	Incorporated into Lugano	Lugano	2013
Cimo	Ticino	Incorporated into Bioggio	Bioggio	2004
Claro	Ticino	Incorporated into Bellinzona	Bellinzona	2017
Clavaleyres	Fribourg	Incorporated into Murten	Murten	2022
Clugin	Grisons	Incorporated into Andeer	Andeer	2009
Coffrane	Neuchâtel	Merged with Boudevilliers, Cernier, Chézard-Saint-Martin, Dombresson, Engollon, Fenin-Vilars-Saules, Fontainemelon, Fontaines, Le Pâquier, Les Geneveys-sur-Coffrane, Les Hauts-Geneveys, Montmollin, Savagnier and Villiers	Val-de-Ruz	2013
Coglio	Ticino	Incorporated into Maggia	Maggia	2004
Colla	Ticino	Merged with Insone, Piandera, Scareglia and Signôra	Valcolla	1956
Colombier	Neuchâtel	Merged with Auvernier and Bôle	Milvignes	2013
Colombier	Vaud	Incorporated into Echichens	Echichens	2011
Combes	Neuchâtel	Incorporated into Le Landeron	Le Landeron (known as Landeron-Combes until 1966)	1875
Combremont-le-Grand	Vaud	Merged with Cerniaz, Combremont-le-Petit, Granges-près-Marnand, Marnand, Sassel, Seigneux and Villars-Bramard	Valbroye	2011
Combremont-le-Petit	Vaud	Merged with Cerniaz, Combremont-le-Grand, Granges-près-Marnand, Marnand, Sassel, Seigneux and Villars-Bramard	Valbroye	2011
Comologno	Ticino	Merged with Crana and Russo	Onsernone	1995
Compesières	Geneva	Split in two	Bardonnex; Plan-les-Ouates	1851
Constantine	Vaud	Merged with Bellerive, Chabrey, Montmagny, Mur, Vallamand and Villars-le-Grand	Vully-les-Lacs	2011
Contone	Ticino	Merged with Caviano, Gerra, Indemini, Magadino, Piazzogna, San Nazzaro, Sant'Abbondio and Vira	Gambarogno	2010
Corban	Jura	Incorporated into Val Terbi	Val Terbi	2018
Corcelles-Cormondrèche	Neuchâtel	Incorporated into Neuchâtel	Neuchâtel	2021
Corcelles-sur-Chavornay	Vaud	Incorporated into Chavornay	Chavornay	2017
Cordast	Fribourg	Incorporated into Gurmels	Gurmels	2005
Corippo	Ticino	Merged with Brione, Cugnasco-Gerra (Gerra Valle), Frasco, Lavertezzo (Lavertezzo Valle), Sonogno and Vogorno	Verzasca	2020
Corjolens	Fribourg	Merged with Avry-sur-Matran	Avry	2001
Cormagens	Fribourg	Merged with La Corbaz and Lossy-Formangueires	La Sonnaz	2004
Cormérod	Fribourg	Merged with Courtion, Cournillens and Misery	Misery-Courtion	1997
Corpataux	Fribourg	Merged with Magnedens	Corpataux-Magnedens	1999
Corpataux-Magnedens	Fribourg	Merged with Farvagny, Le Glèbe, Rossens and Vuisternens-en-Ogoz	Gibloux	2016
Correvon	Vaud	Merged with Chanéaz, Chapelle-sur-Moudon, Denezy, Martherenges, Neyruz-sur-Moudon, Peyres-Possens, Saint-Cierges and Thierrens	Montanaire	2013
Corsalettes	Fribourg	Incorporated into Grolley	Grolley	2000
Corserey	Fribourg	Merged with Noréaz and Prez-vers-Noréaz	Prez	2020
Corticiasca	Ticino	Incorporated into Capriasca	Capriasca	2008
Corzoneso	Ticino	Merged with Castro, Dongio, Largario, Leontica, Lottigna, Marolta, Ponto Valentino and Prugiasco	Acquarossa	2004
Cottens	Vaud	Merged with Apples, Bussy-Chardonney, Pampigny, Reverolle and Sévery	Hautemorges	2021
Courfaivre	Jura	Merged with Bassecourt, Glovelier, Soulce and Undervelier	Haute-Sorne	2013
Courlevon	Fribourg	Incorporated into Murten	Murten	2016
Cournillens	Fribourg	Merged with Courtion, Cormérod and Misery	Misery-Courtion	1997
Courtaman	Fribourg	Incorporated into Courtepin	Courtepin	2003
Courtemaîche	Jura	Merged with Buix and Montignez	Basse-Allaine	2009
Courtion	Fribourg	Merged with Cormérod, Cournillens and Misery	Misery-Courtion	1997
Coussiberlé	Fribourg	Incorporated into Courlevon	Courlevon	1974
Couvet	Neuchâtel	Merged with Boveresse, Buttes, Fleurier, Les Bayards, Môtiers, Noiraigue, Saint-Sulpice and Travers	Val-de-Travers	2009
Crana	Ticino	Merged with Comologno and Russo	Onsernone	1995
Cremin	Vaud	Incorporated into Lucens	Lucens	2017
Cresciano	Ticino	Merged with Iragna, Lodrino and Osogna	Riviera	2017
Croglio	Ticino	Merged with Monteggio, Ponte Tresa and Sessa	Tresa	2021
Croglio-Castelrotto	Ticino	Merged with Biogno-Beride	Croglio	1976
Cugnasco	Ticino	Merged with Gerra	Cugnasco-Gerra	2009
Cugnasco-Gerra (Gerra Valle)	Ticino	Merged with Brione, Corippo, Frasco, Lavertezzo (Lavertezzo Valle), Sonogno and Vogorno	Verzasca	2020
Cully	Vaud	Merged with Epesses, Grandvaux, Riex and Villette	Bourg-en-Lavaux	2011
Cumbel	Grisons	Merged with Degen, Lumbrein, Morissen, Suraua, Vella, Vignogn and Vrin	Lumnezia	2013
Cunter	Grisons	Merged with Bivio, Marmorera, Mulegns, Riom-Parsonz, Salouf, Savognin, Sur and Tinizong-Rona	Surses	2016
Cureggia	Ticino	Incorporated into Lugano	Lugano	2004
Curio	Ticino	Merged with Astano, Bedigliora, Miglieglia and Novaggio	Lema	2025
Cutterwil	Fribourg	Incorporated into Belfaux	Belfaux	1977
Damphreux	Jura	Merged with Lugnez	Damphreux-Lugnez	2023
Damvant	Jura	Merged with Chevenez, Réclère and Roche-d'Or	Haute-Ajoie	2009
Daro	Ticino	Incorporated into Bellinzona	Bellinzona	1907
Dättwil	Aargau	Incorporated into Dättwil	Dättwil	1962
Davesco-Soragno	Ticino	Incorporated into Lugano	Lugano	2004
Degen	Grisons	Merged with Cumbel, Lumbrein, Morissen, Suraua, Vella, Vignogn and Vrin	Lumnezia	2013
Delley	Fribourg	Merged with Portalban	Delley-Portalban	2005
Denezy	Vaud	Merged with Chanéaz, Chapelle-sur-Moudon, Correvon, Martherenges, Neyruz-sur-Moudon, Peyres-Possens, Saint-Cierges and Thierrens	Montanaire	2013
Dettighofen	Thurgau	Incorporated into Pfyn	Pfyn	1998
Diemerswil	Bern	Incorporated into Münchenbuchsee	Münchenbuchsee	2023
Diesbach	Glarus	Incorporated into Luchsingen	Luchsingen	2004
Diesse	Bern	Merged with Lamboing and Prêles	Plateau de Diesse	2014
Dippishausen-Oftershausen	Thurgau	Incorporated into Siegershausen	Siegershausen	1984
Dombresson	Neuchâtel	Merged with Boudevilliers, Cernier, Chézard-Saint-Martin, Coffrane, Engollon, Fenin-Vilars-Saules, Fontainemelon, Fontaines, Le Pâquier, Les Geneveys-sur-Coffrane, Les Hauts-Geneveys, Montmollin, Savagnier and Villiers	Val-de-Ruz	2013
Domdidier	Fribourg	Merged with Dompierre, Léchelles and Russy	Belmont-Broye	2016
Dommartin	Vaud	Merged with Naz, Poliez-le-Grand and Sugnens	Montilliez	2011
Dompierre	Fribourg	Merged with Domdidier, Léchelles and Russy	Belmont-Broye	2016
Donat	Grisons	Merged with Casti-Wergenstein, Lohn and Mathon	Muntogna da Schons	2021
Donath	Grisons	Merged with Patzen-Fardün	Donat	2003
Donatyre	Vaud	Incorporated into Avenches	Avenches	2006
Dongio	Ticino	Merged with Castro, Corzoneso, Largario, Leontica, Lottigna, Marolta, Ponto Valentino and Prugiasco	Acquarossa	2004
Donzhausen	Thurgau	Incorporated into Sulgen	Sulgen	1996
Dotnacht	Thurgau	Merged with Alterswilen, Altishausen, Ellighausen, Hugelshofen, Lippoldswilen, Neuwilen and Siegershausen	Kemmental	1996
Dünnershaus	Thurgau	Incorporated into Langrickenbach	Langrickenbach	1998
Dussnang	Thurgau	Incorporated into Fischingen	Fischingen	1972
Duvin	Grisons	Merged with Castrisch, Ilanz, Ladir, Luven, Pigniu, Pitasch, Riein, Rueun, Ruschein, Schnaus, Sevgein and Siat	Ilanz/Glion	2014
Eaux-Vives	Geneva	Incorporated into Geneva	Geneva	1931
Ebersecken	Lucerne	Incorporated into Altishofen	Altishofen	2020
Ebligen	Bern	Incorporated into Oberried am Brienzersee	Oberried am Brienzersee	1914
Ebnat	St. Gallen	Merged with Kappel	Ebnat-Kappel	1965
Éclagnens	Vaud	Merged with Goumoens-la-Ville and Goumoens-le-Jux	Goumoëns	2011
Écoteaux	Vaud	Merged with Bussigny-sur-Oron, Châtillens, Chesalles-sur-Oron, Les Tavernes, Les Thioleyres, Oron-la-Ville, Oron-le-Châtel, Palézieux and Vuibroye	Oron	2012
Écublens	Fribourg	Incorporated into Rue	Rue	2025
Ecuvillens	Fribourg	Merged with Posieux	Hauterive	2001
Effingen	Aargau	Merged with Bözen, Elfingen and Hornussen	Böztal	2022
Elfingen	Aargau	Merged with Bözen, Effingen and Hornussen	Böztal	2022
Ellighausen	Thurgau	Merged with Alterswilen, Altishausen, Dotnacht, Hugelshofen, Lippoldswilen, Neuwilen and Siegershausen	Kemmental	1996
Elm	Glarus	Merged with Betschwanden, Braunwald, Engi, Haslen, Linthal, Luchsingen, Matt, Mitlödi, Rüti, Schwanden, Schwändi and Sool	Glarus Süd	2011
Emmishofen	Thurgau	Incorporated into Kreuzlingen	Kreuzlingen	1928
Enge	Zürich	Incorporated into Zürich	Zürich	1893
Enges	Neuchâtel	Merged with Hauterive, La Tène and Saint-Blaise	Laténa	2025
Engi	Glarus	Merged with Betschwanden, Braunwald, Elm, Haslen, Linthal, Luchsingen, Matt, Mitlödi, Rüti, Schwanden, Schwändi and Sool	Glarus Süd	2011
Engishofen	Thurgau	Incorporated into Erlen	Erlen	1995
Englisberg	Bern	Merged with Zimmerwald	Wald	2004
Engollon	Neuchâtel	Merged with Boudevilliers, Cernier, Chézard-Saint-Martin, Coffrane, Dombresson, Fenin-Vilars-Saules, Fontainemelon, Fontaines, Le Pâquier, Les Geneveys-sur-Coffrane, Les Hauts-Geneveys, Montmollin, Savagnier and Villiers	Val-de-Ruz	2013
Engwang	Thurgau	Incorporated into Wigoltingen	Wigoltingen	1995
Engwilen	Thurgau	Incorporated into Wäldi	Wäldi	1995
Ennenda	Glarus	Incorporated into Glarus	Glarus	2011
Ennetaach	Thurgau	Incorporated into Erlen	Erlen	1995
Enney	Fribourg	Merged with Estavannens and Villars-sous-Mont	Bas-Intyamon	2004
Envy	Vaud	Merged with Romainmôtier	Romainmôtier-Envy	1970
Epagnier	Neuchâtel	Merged with Marin	Marin-Epagnier	1888
Epauvillers	Jura	Merged with Epiquerez, Montenol, Montmelon, Ocourt, Saint-Ursanne and Seleute	Clos du Doubs	2009
Épendes	Fribourg	Merged with Arconciel and Senèdes	Bois-d'Amont	2021
Epesses	Vaud	Merged with Cully, Grandvaux, Riex and Villette	Bourg-en-Lavaux	2011
Epiquerez	Jura	Merged with Epauvillers, Montenol, Montmelon, Ocourt, Saint-Ursanne and Seleute	Clos-du-Doubs	2009
Ernetschwil	St. Gallen	Incorporated into Gommiswald	Gommiswald	2013
Erschmatt	Valais	Incorporated into Leuk	Leuk	2013
Eschiens	Fribourg	Incorporated into Ecublens	Ecublens	1969
Eschikofen	Thurgau	Incorporated into Hüttlingen	Hüttlingen	1999
Escholzmatt	Lucerne	Merged with Marbach	Escholzmatt-Marbach	2013
Esmonts	Fribourg	Incorporated into Vuarmarens	Vuarmarens	2006
Essert	Fribourg	Merged with Bonnefontaine, Montévraz, Oberried, Praroman and Zénauva	Le Mouret	2003
Essert-Pittet	Vaud	Incorporated into Chavornay	Chavornay	2017
Essert-sous-Champvent	Vaud	Incorporated into Champvent	Champvent	2012
Essertes	Vaud	Incorporated into Oron	Oron	2022
Estavannens	Fribourg	Merged with Enney and Villars-sous-Mont	Bas-Intyamon	2004
Estavayer-le-Gibloux	Fribourg	Merged with Rueyres-Saint-Laurent, Villarlod and Villarsel-le-Gibloux	Le Glèbe	2003
Estavayer-le-Lac	Fribourg	Merged with Bussy, Morens, Murist, Rueyres-les-Prés, Vernay and Vuissens	Estavayer	2017
Estévenens	Fribourg	Incorporated into Vuisternens-devant-Romont	Vuisternens-devant-Romont	2003
Ettenhausen	Thurgau	Incorporated into Aadorf	Aadorf	1996
Etzelkofen	Bern	Incorporated into Fraubrunnen	Fraubrunnen	2014
Etzgen	Aargau	Merged with Hottwil, Mettau, Oberhofen and Wil	Mettauertal	2010
Eyholz	Valais	Incorporated into Visp	Visp	1972
Fahrhof	Thurgau	Incorporated into Oberneunforn	Oberneunforn	1870
Fanas	Grisons	Incorporated into Grüsch	Grüsch	2011
Farvagny	Fribourg	Merged with Corpataux-Magnedens, Le Glèbe, Rossens and Vuisternens-en-Ogoz	Gibloux	2016
Farvagny-le-Grand	Fribourg	Merged with Farvagny-le-Petit, Grenilles and Posat	Farvagny	1996
Farvagny-le-Petit	Fribourg	Merged with Farvagny-le-Grand, Grenilles and Posat	Farvagny	1996
Felben	Thurgau	Merged with Wellhausen	Felben-Wellhausen	1983
Feldis/Veulden	Grisons	Merged with Scheid, Trans and Tumegl/Tomils	Tomils	2009
Fenin	Neuchâtel	Merged with Vilars and Saules	Fenin-Vilars-Saules	1875
Fenin-Vilars-Saules	Neuchâtel	Merged with Boudevilliers, Cernier, Chézard-Saint-Martin, Coffrane, Dombresson, Engollon, Fontainemelon, Fontaines, Le Pâquier, Les Geneveys-sur-Coffrane, Les Hauts-Geneveys, Montmollin, Savagnier and Villiers	Val-de-Ruz	2013
Ferlens	Vaud	Merged with Carrouge and Mézières	Jorat-Mézières	2016
Feschel	Valais	Merged with Guttet	Guttet-Feschel	2000
Fescoggia	Ticino	Merged with Arosio, Breno, Mugena and Vezio	Alto Malcantone	2005
Fétigny	Fribourg	Merged with Ménières	Fétigny-Ménières	2026
Fiaugères	Fribourg	Incorporated into Saint-Martin	Saint-Martin	2004
Filet	Valais	Merged with Mörel	Mörel-Filet	2009
Filisur	Grisons	Merged with Bergün/Bravuogn	Bergün Filisur	2018
Filzbach	Glarus	Merged with Bilten, Mollis, Mühlehorn, Näfels, Niederurnen, Oberurnen and Obstalden	Glarus Nord	2011
Fleurier	Neuchâtel	Merged with Boveresse, Buttes, Couvet, Les Bayards, Môtiers, Noiraigue, Saint-Sulpice and Travers	Val-de-Travers	2009
Flond	Grisons	Merged with Surcuolm	Mundaun	2009
Fluntern	Zürich	Incorporated into Zürich	Zürich	1893
Font	Fribourg	Incorporated into Estavayer-le-Lac	Estavayer-le-Lac	2012
Fontainemelon	Neuchâtel	Merged with Boudevilliers, Cernier, Chézard-Saint-Martin, Coffrane, Dombresson, Engollon, Fenin-Vilars-Saules, Fontaines, Le Pâquier, Les Geneveys-sur-Coffrane, Les Hauts-Geneveys, Montmollin, Savagnier and Villiers	Val-de-Ruz	2013
Fontaines	Neuchâtel	Merged with Boudevilliers, Cernier, Chézard-Saint-Martin, Coffrane, Dombresson, Engollon, Fenin-Vilars-Saules, Fontainemelon, Le Pâquier, Les Geneveys-sur-Coffrane, Les Hauts-Geneveys, Montmollin, Savagnier and Villiers	Val-de-Ruz	2013
Fontanezier	Vaud	Merged with Romairon, Vaugondry and Villars-Burquin	Tévenon	2011
Forel	Fribourg	Merged with Autavaux and Montbrelloz	Vernay	2006
Forel-sur-Lucens	Vaud	Incorporated into Lucens	Lucens	2017
Formangueires	Fribourg	Merged with Lossy	Lossy-Formangueires	1982
Forst	Bern	Merged with Längenbühl	Forst-Längenbühl	2007
Franex	Fribourg	Incorporated into Murist	Murist	1992
Frasco	Ticino	Merged with Brione, Corippo, Cugnasco-Gerra (Gerra Valle), Lavertezzo (Lavertezzo Valle), Sonogno and Vogorno	Verzasca	2020
Frasnacht	Thurgau	Incorporated into Arbon	Arbon	1998
Frasses	Fribourg	Merged with Aumont, Granges-de-Vesin and Montet	Les Montets	2004
Fregiécourt	Jura	Merged with Asuel, Charmoille, Miécourt and Pleujouse	La Baroche	2009
Fresens	Neuchâtel	Merged with Bevaix, Gorgier, Montalchez, Saint-Aubin-Sauges and Vaumarcus	La Grande Béroche	2018
Friltschen	Thurgau	Incorporated into Bussnang	Bussnang	1996
Fruthwilen	Thurgau	Incorporated into Salenstein	Salenstein	1979
Ftan	Grisons	Incorporated into Scuol	Scuol	2015
Fuldera	Grisons	Merged with Lü, Müstair, Santa Maria Val Müstair, Tschierv and Valchava	Val Müstair	2009
Fusio	Ticino	Merged with Broglio, Brontallo, Menzonio, Peccia and Prato-Sornico	Lavizzara	2004
Fuyens	Fribourg	Incorporated into Villaz-Saint-Pierre	Villaz-Saint-Pierre	1978
Gächliwil	Solothurn	Merged with Lüterswil	Lüterswil-Gächliwil	1995
Gadmen	Bern	Incorporated into Innertkirchen	Innertkirchen	2014
Gallenkirch	Aargau	Merged with Linn, Oberbözberg and Unterbözberg	Bözberg	2013
Galmiz	Fribourg	Incorporated into Murten	Murten	2022
Gampel	Valais	Merged with Bratsch	Gampel-Bratsch	2009
Gandria	Ticino	Incorporated into Lugano	Lugano	2004
Gänsbrunnen	Solothurn	Merged with Welschenrohr	Welschenrohr-Gänsbrunnen	2021
Ganterschwil	St. Gallen	Merged with Bütschwil	Bütschwil-Ganterschwil	2013
Gasenried	Valais	Incorporated into St. Niklaus	St. Niklaus	1870
Gäserz	Bern	Incorporated into Brüttelen	Brüttelen	1917
Gelfingen	Lucerne	Incorporated into Hitzkirch	Hitzkirch	2009
Gelterfingen	Bern	Incorporated into Kirchdorf	Kirchdorf	2018
Gempenach	Fribourg	Incorporated into Murten	Murten	2022
Genestrerio	Ticino	Incorporated into Mendrisio	Mendrisio	2009
Gentilino	Ticino	Merged with Agra and Montagnola	Collina d'Oro	2004
Gerlikon	Thurgau	Incorporated into Frauenfeld	Frauenfeld	1998
Gerra	Ticino	Merged with Caviano, Contone, Indemini, Magadino, Piazzogna, San Nazzaro, Sant'Abbondio and Vira	Gambarogno	2010
Gerra	Ticino	Merged with Cugnasco	Cugnasco-Gerra	2009
Geschinen	Valais	Merged with Münster	Münster-Geschinen	2004
Gettnau	Lucerne	Incorporated into Willisau	Willisau	2021
Ghirone	Ticino	Merged with Aquila, Campo Blenio, Olivone and Torre	Blenio	2006
Gillarens	Fribourg	Incorporated into Rue	Rue	2001
Giubiasco	Ticino	Incorporated into Bellinzona	Bellinzona	2017
Giumaglio	Ticino	Incorporated into Maggia	Maggia	2004
Glis	Valais	Merged with Brig and Brigerbad	Brig-Glis	1972
Glovelier	Jura	Merged with Bassecourt, Courfaivre, Soulce and Undervelier	Haute-Sorne	2013
Gluringen	Valais	Merged with Reckingen	Reckingen-Gluringen	2004
Gnosca	Ticino	Incorporated into Bellinzona	Bellinzona	2017
Golaten	Bern	Incorporated into Kallnach	Kallnach	2019
Goldingen	St. Gallen	Incorporated into Eschenbach	Eschenbach	2013
Goldiwil	Bern	Incorporated into Thun	Thun	1913
Goldswil	Bern	Incorporated into Ringgenberg	Ringgenberg	1853
Goppisberg	Valais	Merged with Greich and Ried-Mörel	Riederalp	2003
Gordevio	Ticino	Merged with Avegno	Avegno Gordevio	2008
Gorduno	Ticino	Incorporated into Bellinzona	Bellinzona	2017
Gorgier	Neuchâtel	Merged with Bevaix, Fresens, Montalchez, Saint-Aubin-Sauges and Vaumarcus	La Grande Béroche	2018
Gossens	Vaud	Incorporated into Donneloye	Donneloye	2008
Gossliwil	Solothurn	Merged with Aetigkofen, Aetingen, Bibern, Brügglen, Hessigkofen, Küttigkofen, Kyburg-Buchegg, Mühledorf and Tscheppach	Buchegg	2014
Götighofen	Thurgau	Incorporated into Sulgen	Sulgen	1996
Gottshaus	Thurgau	Merged with Hauptwil	Hauptwil-Gottshaus	1996
Goumoens-la-Ville	Vaud	Merged with Éclagnens and Goumoens-le-Jux	Goumoëns	2011
Goumoens-le-Jux	Vaud	Merged with Éclagnens and Goumoens-la-Ville	Goumoëns	2011
Goumois	Jura	Incorporated into Saignelégier	Saignelégier	2009
Grafenried	Bern	Incorporated into Fraubrunnen	Fraubrunnen	2014
Grafschaft	Valais	Merged with Blitzingen, Münster-Geschinen, Niederwald and Reckingen-Gluringen	Goms	2017
Graltshausen	Thurgau	Incorporated into Berg	Berg	1995
Grandvaux	Vaud	Merged with Cully, Epesses, Riex and Villette	Bourg-en-Lavaux	2011
Grange-la-Battiaz	Fribourg	Incorporated into Chavannes-sous-Orsonnens	Chavannes-sous-Orsonnens	1866
Granges	Valais	Incorporated into Sierre	Sierre	1972
Granges-de-Vesin	Fribourg	Merged with Aumont, Frasses and Montet	Les Montets	2004
Granges-près-Marnand	Vaud	Merged with Cerniaz, Combremont-le-Grand, Combremont-le-Petit, Marnand, Sassel, Seigneux and Villars-Bramard	Valbroye	2011
Grattavache	Fribourg	Merged with Le Crêt and Progens	La Verrerie	2004
Greich	Valais	Merged with Goppisberg and Ried-Mörel	Riederalp	2003
Grenilles	Fribourg	Merged with Farvagny-le-Grand, Farvagny-le-Petit and Posat	Farvagny	1996
Gresso	Ticino	Incorporated into Onsernone	Onsernone	2016
Gressy	Vaud	Incorporated into Yverdon-les-Bains	Yverdon-les-Bains	2011
Griesenberg	Thurgau	Merged with Amlikon, Bissegg and Strohwilen	Amlikon-Bissegg	1995
Grimentz	Valais	Merged with Ayer, Chandolin, Saint-Jean, Saint-Luc and Vissoie	Anniviers	2009
Grod	Solothurn	Incorporated into Gretzenbach	Gretzenbach	1973
Grolley	Fribourg	Merged with Ponthaux	Grolley-Ponthaux	2025
Grossgurmels	Fribourg	Merged with Monterschu	Gurmels	1978
Grossguschelmuth	Fribourg	Merged with Kleinguschelmuth	Guschelmuth	1978
Grumo	Ticino	Incorporated into Torre	Torre	1928
Gründen	Valais	Incorporated into Ausserberg	Ausserberg	1923
Guarda	Grisons	Incorporated into Scuol	Scuol	2015
Gudo	Ticino	Incorporated into Bellinzona	Bellinzona	2017
Gumefens	Fribourg	Merged with Avry-devant-Pont and Le Bry	Pont-en-Ogoz	2003
Gündelhart-Hörhausen	Thurgau	Incorporated into Homburg	Homburg	1999
Guntershausen bei Aadorf	Thurgau	Incorporated into Aadorf	Aadorf	1996
Guntershausen bei Birwinken	Thurgau	Incorporated into Berg	Berg	1995
Guntmadingen	Schaffhausen	Incorporated into Beringen	Beringen	2013
Gunzwil	Lucerne	Incorporated into Beromünster	Beromünster	2009
Guschelmuth	Fribourg	Incorporated into Gurmels	Gurmels	2003
Gutenburg	Bern	Incorporated into Madiswil	Madiswil	2007
Guttet	Valais	Merged with Feschel	Guttet-Feschel	2000
Gysenstein	Bern	Merged with Stalden im Emmental	Konolfingen	1933
Halden	Thurgau	Incorporated into Bischofszell	Bischofszell	1996
Haldenstein	Grisons	Incorporated into Chur	Chur	2021
Halten	Solothurn	Incorporated into Kriegstetten	Kriegstetten	2026
Hämikon	Lucerne	Incorporated into Hitzkirch	Hitzkirch	2009
Happerswil-Buch	Thurgau	Incorporated into Birwinken	Birwinken	1995
Harenwilen	Thurgau	Incorporated into Hüttlingen	Hüttlingen	1999
Haslen	Glarus	Merged with Betschwanden, Braunwald, Elm, Engi, Linthal, Luchsingen, Matt, Mitlödi, Rüti, Schwanden, Schwändi and Sool	Glarus Süd	2011
Hätzingen	Glarus	Incorporated into Luchsingen	Luchsingen	2004
Hauben	Bern	Incorporated into Oberdiessbach	Oberdiessbach	1888
Hauptwil	Thurgau	Merged with Gottshaus	Hauptwil-Gottshaus	1996
Haut-Vully	Fribourg	Merged with Bas-Vully	Mont-Vully	2016
Hauterive	Neuchâtel	Merged with Enges, La Tène and Saint-Blaise	Laténa	2025
Heiligkreuz	Thurgau	Incorporated into Wuppenau	Wuppenau	1971
Heinrichswil	Solothurn	Merged with Winistorf	Heinrichswil-Winistorf	1993
Heinrichswil-Winistorf	Solothurn	Merged with Hersiwil	Drei Höfe	2013
Heldswil	Thurgau	Incorporated into Hohentannen	Hohentannen	1999
Hemberg	St. Gallen	Incorporated into Neckertal	Neckertal	2023
Hemmental	Schaffhausen	Incorporated into Schaffhausen	Schaffhausen	2009
Hemmerswil	Thurgau	Incorporated into Amriswil	Amriswil	1925
Hennens	Fribourg	Merged with Billens	Billens-Hennens	1998
Herblingen	Schaffhausen	Incorporated into Schaffhausen	Schaffhausen	1964
Herlisberg	Lucerne	Incorporated into Römerswil	Römerswil	2005
Hermetschwil-Staffeln	Aargau	Incorporated into Bremgarten	Bremgarten	2014
Hermiswil	Bern	Incorporated into Seeberg	Seeberg	2016
Herrenhof	Thurgau	Incorporated into Langrickenbach	Langrickenbach	1998
Hersiwil	Solothurn	Merged with Heinrichswil-Winistorf	Drei Höfe	2013
Herten	Thurgau	Incorporated into Frauenfeld	Frauenfeld	1919
Herznach	Aargau	Merged with Ueken	Herznach-Ueken	2023
Hessenreuti	Thurgau	Incorporated into Sulgen	Sulgen	1996
Hessigkofen	Solothurn	Merged with Aetigkofen, Aetingen, Bibern, Brügglen, Gossliwil, Küttigkofen, Kyburg-Buchegg, Mühledorf and Tscheppach	Buchegg	2014
Hilfikon	Aargau	Incorporated into Villmergen	Villmergen	2010
Hinterrhein	Grisons	Merged with Nufenen and Splügen	Rheinwald	2019
Hirschberg	Appenzell; Innerrhoden	Incorporated into Oberegg	Oberegg	1872
Hirslanden	Zürich	Incorporated into Zürich	Zürich	1893
Hirzel	Zürich	Incorporated into Horgen	Horgen	2018
Hof Chur	Grisons	Incorporated into Chur	Chur	1852
Hofen	Schaffhausen	Incorporated into Thayngen	Thayngen	2009
Höfen bei Thun	Bern	Merged with Niederstocken and Oberstocken	Stocken-Höfen	2014
Hofstetten	Zürich	Incorporated into Elgg	Elgg	2018
Hohtenn	Valais	Merged with Steg	Steg-Hohtenn	2008
Holzmannshaus	Thurgau	Split in two	Sirnach; Oberhofen bei Münchwilen	1871
Honau	Lucerne	Incorporated into Root	Root	2025
Höngg	Zürich	Incorporated into Zürich	Zürich	1934
Horben	Thurgau	Divided between several municipalities	Eschlikon; Sirnach	1919
Horgenbach	Thurgau	Incorporated into Frauenfeld	Frauenfeld	1919
Hornussen	Aargau	Merged with Bözen, Effingen and Elfingen	Böztal	2022
Hosenruck	Thurgau	Incorporated into Wuppenau	Wuppenau	1971
Hottingen	Zürich	Incorporated into Zürich	Zürich	1893
Hottwil	Aargau	Merged with Etzgen, Mettau, Oberhofen and Wil	Mettauertal	2010
Huben	Thurgau	Incorporated into Frauenfeld	Frauenfeld	1919
Hugelshofen	Thurgau	Merged with Alterswilen, Altishausen, Dotnacht, Ellighausen, Lippoldswilen, Neuwilen and Siegershausen	Kemmental	1996
Humlikon	Zürich	Incorporated into Andelfingen	Andelfingen	2023
Hütten	Zürich	Incorporated into Wädenswil	Wädenswil	2019
Iberg	Schwyz	Split in two	Oberiberg; Unteriberg	1884
Ichertswil	Solothurn	Merged with Lüterkofen	Lüterkofen-Ichertswil	1961
Igis	Grisons	Merged with Mastrils	Landquart	2012
Ilanz	Grisons	Merged with Castrisch, Duvin, Ladir, Luven, Pigniu, Pitasch, Riein, Rueun, Ruschein, Schnaus, Sevgein and Siat	Ilanz/Glion	2014
Illens	Fribourg	Incorporated into Rossens	Rossens	1972
Illhart	Thurgau	Incorporated into Wigoltingen	Wigoltingen	1995
Illighausen	Thurgau	Merged with Oberhofen bei Kreuzlingen	Lengwil	1998
Indemini	Ticino	Merged with Caviano, Contone, Gerra, Magadino, Piazzogna, San Nazzaro, Sant'Abbondio and Vira	Gambarogno	2010
Innerbirrmoos	Bern	Merged with Ausserbirrmoos and Otterbach	Linden	1946
Innerferrera	Grisons	Merged with Ausserferrera	Ferrera	2008
Insone	Ticino	Merged with Colla, Piandera, Scareglia and Signôra	Valcolla	1956
Intragna	Ticino	Merged with Borgnone and Palagnedra	Centovalli	2009
Iragna	Ticino	Merged with Cresciano, Lodrino and Osogna	Riviera	2017
Isenfluh	Bern	Incorporated into Lauterbrunnen	Lauterbrunnen	1973
Iseo	Ticino	Incorporated into Bioggio	Bioggio	2008
Islikon	Thurgau	Incorporated into Gachnang	Gachnang	1998
Isorno	Ticino	Incorporated into Onsernone	Onsernone	2016
Istighofen	Thurgau	Incorporated into Bürglen	Bürglen	1995
Ittenthal	Aargau	Incorporated into Kaisten	Kaisten	2010
Jeuss	Fribourg	Incorporated into Murten	Murten	2016
Jona	St. Gallen	Merged with Rapperswil	Rapperswil-Jona	2007
Kaiserstuhl	Aargau	Merged with Bad Zurzach, Baldingen, Böbikon, Rekingen, Rietheim, Rümikon and Wislikofen	Zurzach	2022
Kaltenbach	Thurgau	Incorporated into Wagenhausen	Wagenhausen	1995
Kalthäusern	Thurgau	Incorporated into Lommis	Lommis	1995
Kappel	St. Gallen	Merged with Ebnat	Ebnat-Kappel	1965
Kefikon	Thurgau	Incorporated into Gachnang	Gachnang	1998
Kempfhof	Aargau	Incorporated into Würenlos	Würenlos	1900
Kerenzen-Mühlehorn	Glarus	Split in three	Filzbach; Mühlehorn; Obstalden	1887
Kienersrüti	Bern	Incorporated into Uttigen	Uttigen	2014
Kirchenthurnen	Bern	Merged with Lohnstorf and Mühlethurnen	Thurnen	2020
Klarsreuti	Thurgau	Incorporated into Birwinken	Birwinken	1995
Kleindietwil	Bern	Incorporated into Madiswil	Madiswil	2011
Kleingurmels	Fribourg	Incorporated into Gurmels	Gurmels	2000
Kleinguschelmuth	Fribourg	Merged with Grossguschelmuth	Guschelmuth	1978
Kleinhüningen	Basel-City	Incorporated into Basel	Basel	1908
Kottwil	Lucerne	Incorporated into Ettiswil	Ettiswil	2006
Kradolf	Thurgau	Merged with Buhwil, Neukirch an der Thur and Schönenberg an der Thur	Kradolf-Schönenberg	1996
Krillberg	Thurgau	Incorporated into Wängi	Wängi	1969
Krinau	St. Gallen	Incorporated into Wattwil	Wattwil	2013
Krummenau	St. Gallen	Merged with Nesslau	Nesslau-Krummenau	2005
Kulmerau	Lucerne	Incorporated into Triengen	Triengen	2005
Kümmertshausen	Thurgau	Incorporated into Erlen	Erlen	1995
Kurzdorf	Thurgau	Incorporated into Frauenfeld	Frauenfeld	1919
Kurzrickenbach	Thurgau	Incorporated into Kreuzlingen	Kreuzlingen	1927
Küttigkofen	Solothurn	Merged with Aetigkofen, Aetingen, Bibern, Brügglen, Gossliwil, Hessigkofen, Kyburg-Buchegg, Mühledorf and Tscheppach	Buchegg	2014
Kyburg	Zürich	Incorporated into Illnau-Effretikon	Illnau-Effretikon	2016
Kyburg-Buchegg	Solothurn	Merged with Aetigkofen, Aetingen, Bibern, Brügglen, Gossliwil, Hessigkofen, Küttigkofen, Mühledorf and Tscheppach	Buchegg	2014
La Bâtiaz	Valais	Incorporated into Martigny-Ville	Martigny-Ville	1956
La Chaux-des-Breuleux	Jura	Incorporated into Les Breuleux	Les Breuleux	2023
La Corbaz	Fribourg	Merged with Cormagens and Lossy-Formangueires	La Sonnaz	2004
La Coudre	Neuchâtel	Incorporated into Neuchâtel	Neuchâtel	1930
La Folliaz	Fribourg	Merged with Villaz-Saint-Pierre	Villaz	2020
La Heutte	Bern	Merged with Péry	Péry-la-Heutte	2015
La Joux	Fribourg	Incorporated into Vuisternens-devant-Romont	Vuisternens-devant-Romont	2003
La Magne	Fribourg	Incorporated into Vuisternens-devant-Romont	Vuisternens-devant-Romont	2003
La Neirigue	Fribourg	Incorporated into Vuisternens-devant-Romont	Vuisternens-devant-Romont	2004
La Rogivue	Vaud	Incorporated into Maracon	Maracon	2003
La Rougève	Fribourg	Incorporated into Semsales	Semsales	1968
La Tène	Neuchâtel	Merged with Enges, Hauterive and Saint-Blaise	Laténa	2025
La Tour-de-Trême	Fribourg	Incorporated into Bulle	Bulle	2006
La Vounaise	Fribourg	Incorporated into Murist	Murist	1981
Ladir	Grisons	Merged with Castrisch, Duvin, Ilanz, Luven, Pigniu, Pitasch, Riein, Rueun, Ruschein, Schnaus, Sevgein and Siat	Ilanz/Glion	2014
Lamboing	Bern	Merged with Diesse and Prêles	Plateau de Diesse	2014
Landarenca	Grisons	Incorporated into Arvigo	Arvigo	1980
Landschlacht	Thurgau	Merged with a part of Scherzingen	Münsterlingen	1994
Langdorf	Thurgau	Incorporated into Frauenfeld	Frauenfeld	1919
Längenbühl	Bern	Merged with Forst	Forst-Längenbühl	2007
Langenhart	Thurgau	Incorporated into Müllheim	Müllheim	1967
Langnau bei Reiden	Lucerne	Incorporated into Reiden	Reiden	2006
Langwies	Grisons	Incorporated into Arosa	Arosa	2013
Lanterswil	Thurgau	Incorporated into Bussnang	Bussnang	1996
Lanzenneunforn	Thurgau	Incorporated into Herdern	Herdern	1998
Largario	Ticino	Merged with Castro, Corzoneso, Dongio, Leontica, Lottigna, Marolta, Ponto Valentino and Prugiasco	Acquarossa	2004
Latsch	Grisons	Incorporated into Bergün/Bravuogn	Bergün/Bravuogn	1912
Laufen Stadt	Bern	Merged with Laufen Vorstadt	Laufen	1852
Laufen Vorstadt	Bern	Merged with Laufen Stadt	Laufen	1852
Lauffohr	Aargau	Incorporated into Brugg	Brugg	1970
Lavertezzo (Lavertezzo Valle)	Ticino	Merged with Brione, Corippo, Cugnasco-Gerra (Gerra Valle), Frasco, Sonogno and Vogorno	Verzasca	2020
Lavey	Vaud	Merged with Morcles	Lavey-Morcles	1852
Lavin	Grisons	Incorporated into Zernez	Zernez	2015
Le Bry	Fribourg	Merged with Avry-devant-Pont and Gumefens	Pont-en-Ogoz	2003
Le Crêt	Fribourg	Merged with Grattavache and Progens	La Verrerie	2004
Le Glèbe	Fribourg	Merged with Corpataux-Magnedens, Farvagny, Rossens and Vuisternens-en-Ogoz	Gibloux	2016
Le Pâquier	Neuchâtel	Merged with Boudevilliers, Cernier, Chézard-Saint-Martin, Coffrane, Dombresson, Engollon, Fenin-Vilars-Saules, Fontainemelon, Fontaines, Les Geneveys-sur-Coffrane, Les Hauts-Geneveys, Montmollin, Savagnier and Villiers	Val-de-Ruz	2013
Le Petit-Saconnex	Geneva	Incorporated into Geneva	Geneva	1931
Le Peuchapatte	Jura	Incorporated into Muriaux	Muriaux	2009
Le Saulgy	Fribourg	Incorporated into Siviriez	Siviriez	1978
Léchelles	Fribourg	Merged with Domdidier, Dompierre and Russy	Belmont-Broye	2016
Leggia	Grisons	Incorporated into Grono	Grono	2017
Leimbach	Thurgau	Incorporated into Bürglen	Bürglen	1995
Leimbach	Zürich	Incorporated into Zürich	Zürich	1893
Leimiswil	Bern	Incorporated into Madiswil	Madiswil	2011
Lentigny	Fribourg	Merged with Onnens and Lovens	La Brillaz	2001
Leontica	Ticino	Merged with Castro, Corzoneso, Dongio, Largario, Lottigna, Marolta, Ponto Valentino and Prugiasco	Acquarossa	2004
Les Agettes	Valais	Incorporated into Sion	Sion	2017
Les Bayards	Neuchâtel	Merged with Boveresse, Buttes, Couvet, Fleurier, Môtiers, Noiraigue, Saint-Sulpice and Travers	Val-de-Travers	2009
Les Brenets	Neuchâtel	Incorporated into Le Locle	Le Locle	2021
Les Cullayes	Vaud	Incorporated into Servion	Servion	2012
Les Ecasseys	Fribourg	Incorporated into Vuisternens-devant-Romont	Vuisternens-devant-Romont	2003
Les Eplatures	Neuchâtel	Incorporated into La Chaux-de-Fonds	La Chaux-de-Fonds	1900
Les Friques	Fribourg	Incorporated into Saint-Aubin	Saint-Aubin	1991
Les Geneveys-sur-Coffrane	Neuchâtel	Merged with Boudevilliers, Cernier, Chézard-Saint-Martin, Coffrane, Dombresson, Engollon, Fenin-Vilars-Saules, Fontainemelon, Fontaines, Le Pâquier, Les Hauts-Geneveys, Montmollin, Savagnier and Villiers	Val-de-Ruz	2013
Les Glânes	Fribourg	Incorporated into Romont	Romont	1981
Les Hauts-Geneveys	Neuchâtel	Merged with Boudevilliers, Cernier, Chézard-Saint-Martin, Coffrane, Dombresson, Engollon, Fenin-Vilars-Saules, Fontainemelon, Fontaines, Le Pâquier, Les Geneveys-sur-Coffrane, Montmollin, Savagnier and Villiers	Val-de-Ruz	2013
Les Pommerats	Jura	Incorporated into Saignelégier	Saignelégier	2009
Les Tavernes	Vaud	Merged with Bussigny-sur-Oron, Châtillens, Chesalles-sur-Oron, Écoteaux, Les Thioleyres, Oron-la-Ville, Oron-le-Châtel, Palézieux and Vuibroye	Oron	2012
Les Thioleyres	Vaud	Merged with Bussigny-sur-Oron, Châtillens, Chesalles-sur-Oron, Écoteaux, Les Tavernes, Oron-la-Ville, Oron-le-Châtel, Palézieux and Vuibroye	Oron	2012
Lessoc	Fribourg	Merged with Albeuve, Montbovon and Neirivue	Haut-Intyamon	2002
Leuggelbach	Glarus	Incorporated into Haslen	Haslen	2006
Liebistorf	Fribourg	Incorporated into Gurmels	Gurmels	2003
Lieffrens	Fribourg	Incorporated into Vuisternens-devant-Romont	Vuisternens-devant-Romont	2003
Lieli	Aargau	Incorporated into Oberwil	Oberwil	1909
Lieli	Lucerne	Incorporated into Hohenrain	Hohenrain	2007
Ligornetto	Ticino	Incorporated into Mendrisio	Mendrisio	2013
Limpach	Bern	Incorporated into Fraubrunnen	Fraubrunnen	2014
Linn	Aargau	Merged with Gallenkirch, Oberbözberg and Unterbözberg	Bözberg	2013
Linthal	Glarus	Merged with Betschwanden, Braunwald, Elm, Engi, Haslen, Luchsingen, Matt, Mitlödi, Rüti, Schwanden, Schwändi and Sool	Glarus Süd	2011
Lipperswil	Thurgau	Incorporated into Wäldi	Wäldi	1995
Lippoldswilen	Thurgau	Merged with Alterswilen, Altishausen, Dotnacht, Ellighausen, Hugelshofen, Neuwilen and Siegershausen	Kemmental	1996
Littau	Lucerne	Incorporated into Lucerne	Lucerne	2010
Loco	Ticino	Merged with Auressio and Berzona	Isorno	2001
Lodano	Ticino	Incorporated into Maggia	Maggia	2004
Lodrino	Ticino	Merged with Cresciano, Iragna and Osogna	Riviera	2017
Lohn	Grisons	Merged with Casti-Wergenstein, Donat and Mathon	Muntogna da Schons	2021
Lohn	Solothurn	Merged with Ammannsegg	Lohn-Ammannsegg	1993
Lohnstorf	Bern	Merged with Kirchenthurnen and Mühlethurnen	Thurnen	2020
Lopagno	Ticino	Merged with Cagiallo, Roveredo, Sala Capriasca, Tesserete and Vaglio	Capriasca	2001
Lossy	Fribourg	Merged with Formangueires	Lossy-Formangueires	1982
Lossy-Formangueires	Fribourg	Merged with Cormagens and La Corbaz	La Sonnaz	2004
Lottigna	Ticino	Merged with Castro, Corzoneso, Dongio, Largario, Leontica, Marolta, Ponto Valentino and Prugiasco	Acquarossa	2004
Lovens	Fribourg	Merged with Onnens and Lentigny	La Brillaz	2001
Lü	Grisons	Merged with Fuldera, Müstair, Santa Maria Val Müstair, Tschierv and Valchava	Val Müstair	2009
Luchsingen	Glarus	Merged with Betschwanden, Braunwald, Elm, Engi, Haslen, Linthal, Matt, Mitlödi, Rüti, Schwanden, Schwändi and Sool	Glarus Süd	2011
Ludiano	Ticino	Merged with Malvaglia and Semione	Serravalle	2012
Lüen	Grisons	Incorporated into Arosa	Arosa	2013
Lugaggia	Ticino	Incorporated into Capriasca	Capriasca	2008
Lugnez	Jura	Merged with Damphreux	Damphreux-Lugnez	2023
Lumbrein	Grisons	Merged with Cumbel, Degen, Morissen, Suraua, Vella, Vignogn and Vrin	Lumnezia	2013
Lurtigen	Fribourg	Incorporated into Murten	Murten	2016
Lüsai	Grisons	Incorporated into Lü	Lü	1878
Lussery	Vaud	Merged with Villars-Lussery	Lussery-Villars	1999
Lüsslingen	Solothurn	Merged with Nennigkofen	Lüsslingen-Nennigkofen	2013
Lussy	Fribourg	Merged with Villarimboud	La Folliaz	2005
Lustdorf	Thurgau	Incorporated into Thundorf	Thundorf	1995
Lüterkofen	Solothurn	Merged with Ichertswil	Lüterkofen-Ichertswil	1961
Lüterswil	Solothurn	Merged with Gächliwil	Lüterswil-Gächliwil	1995
Lüterswil-Gächliwil	Solothurn	Incorporated into Buchegg	Buchegg	2024
Luven	Grisons	Merged with Castrisch, Duvin, Ilanz, Ladir, Pigniu, Pitasch, Riein, Rueun, Ruschein, Schnaus, Sevgein and Siat	Ilanz/Glion	2014
Macconnens	Fribourg	Incorporated into Villarimboud	Villarimboud	1973
Madretsch	Bern	Incorporated into Biel/Bienne	Biel/Bienne	1920
Magadino	Ticino	Merged with Caviano, Contone, Gerra, Indemini, Piazzogna, San Nazzaro, Sant'Abbondio and Vira	Gambarogno	2010
Magnedens	Fribourg	Merged with Corpataux	Corpataux-Magnedens	1999
Mairengo	Ticino	Incorporated into Faido	Faido	2012
Maladers	Grisons	Incorporated into Chur	Chur	2020
Malapalud	Vaud	Incorporated into Assens	Assens	2009
Malix	Grisons	Incorporated into Churwalden	Churwalden	2010
Malleray	Bern	Merged with Bévilard and Pontenet	Valbirse	2015
Malvaglia	Ticino	Merged with Ludiano and Semione	Serravalle	2012
Mannenbach	Thurgau	Incorporated into Salenstein	Salenstein	1979
Mannens-Grandsivaz	Fribourg	Incorporated into Montagny	Montagny	2004
Marbach	Lucerne	Merged with Escholzmatt	Escholzmatt-Marbach	2013
Marin	Neuchâtel	Merged with Epagnier	Marin-Epagnier	1888
Marin-Epagnier	Neuchâtel	Merged with Thielle-Wavre	La Tène	2009
Marly-le-Grand	Fribourg	Merged with Marly-le-Petit	Marly	1970
Marly-le-Petit	Fribourg	Merged with Marly-le-Grand	Marly	1970
Marmorera	Grisons	Merged with Bivio, Cunter, Mulegns, Riom-Parsonz, Salouf, Savognin, Sur and Tinizong-Rona	Surses	2016
Marnand	Vaud	Merged with Cerniaz, Combremont-le-Grand, Combremont-le-Petit, Granges-près-Marnand, Sassel, Seigneux and Villars-Bramard	Valbroye	2011
Maroggia	Ticino	Merged with Melano and Rovio	Val Mara	2022
Marolta	Ticino	Merged with Castro, Corzoneso, Dongio, Largario, Leontica, Lottigna, Ponto Valentino and Prugiasco	Acquarossa	2004
Martherenges	Vaud	Merged with Chanéaz, Chapelle-sur-Moudon, Correvon, Denezy, Neyruz-sur-Moudon, Peyres-Possens, Saint-Cierges and Thierrens	Montanaire	2013
Martigny-Bourg	Valais	Merged with Martigny-Ville	Martigny	1964
Martigny-Ville	Valais	Merged with Martigny-Bourg	Martigny	1964
Martisberg	Valais	Merged with Betten	Bettmeralp	2014
Märwil	Thurgau	Incorporated into Affeltrangen	Affeltrangen	1995
Mase	Valais	Merged with Nax and Vernamiège	Mont-Noble	2011
Mastrils	Grisons	Merged with Igis	Landquart	2012
Mathon	Grisons	Merged with Casti-Wergenstein, Donat and Lohn	Muntogna da Schons	2021
Matt	Glarus	Merged with Betschwanden, Braunwald, Elm, Engi, Haslen, Linthal, Luchsingen, Mitlödi, Rüti, Schwanden, Schwändi and Sool	Glarus Süd	2011
Mattwil	Thurgau	Incorporated into Birwinken	Birwinken	1995
Maules	Fribourg	Merged with Romanens, Rueyres-Treyfayes and Sâles (Gruyère)	Sâles	2001
Mauren	Thurgau	Incorporated into Berg	Berg	1995
Medeglia	Ticino	Merged with Bironico, Camignolo, Rivera and Sigirino	Monteceneri	2010
Medels im Rheinwald	Grisons	Incorporated into Splügen	Splügen	2006
Melano	Ticino	Merged with Maroggia and Rovio	Val Mara	2022
Mellstorf	Aargau	Incorporated into Wislikofen	Wislikofen	1899
Ménières	Fribourg	Merged with Fétigny	Fétigny-Ménières	2026
Menzonio	Ticino	Merged with Broglio, Brontallo, Fusio, Peccia and Prato-Sornico	Lavizzara	2004
Meride	Ticino	Incorporated into Mendrisio	Mendrisio	2013
Messen-Scheunen	Bern	Merged with Oberscheunen	Scheunen	1912
Mett	Bern	Incorporated into Biel/Bienne	Biel/Bienne	1920
Mett-Oberschlatt	Thurgau	Merged with Unterschlatt	Schlatt	1999
Mettau	Aargau	Merged with Etzgen, Hottwil, Oberhofen and Wil	Mettauertal	2010
Mettendorf	Thurgau	Incorporated into Hüttlingen	Hüttlingen	1999
Mettlen	Thurgau	Incorporated into Bussnang	Bussnang	1996
Mex	Valais	Incorporated into Saint-Maurice	Saint-Maurice	2013
Mézery-près-Donneloye	Vaud	Incorporated into Donneloye	Donneloye	2008
Mézières	Vaud	Merged with Carrouge and Ferlens	Jorat-Mézières	2016
Middes	Fribourg	Merged with Torny-le-Grand	Torny	2004
Miécourt	Jura	Merged with Asuel, Charmoille, Fregiécourt and Pleujouse	La Baroche	2009
Miège	Valais	Merged with Venthône and Veyras	Noble-Contrée	2021
Miglieglia	Ticino	Merged with Astano, Bedigliora, Curio and Novaggio	Lema	2025
Misery	Fribourg	Merged with Courtion, Cormérod and Cournillens	Misery-Courtion	1997
Mitlödi	Glarus	Merged with Betschwanden, Braunwald, Elm, Engi, Haslen, Linthal, Luchsingen, Matt, Rüti, Schwanden, Schwändi and Sool	Glarus Süd	2011
Mogelsberg	St. Gallen	Merged with Brunnadern and St. Peterzell	Neckertal	2009
Moghegno	Ticino	Incorporated into Maggia	Maggia	2004
Moleno	Ticino	Incorporated into Bellinzona	Bellinzona	2017
Molinis	Grisons	Incorporated into Arosa	Arosa	2013
Mollens	Valais	Merged with Chermignon, Montana and Randogne	Crans-Montana	2017
Mollis	Glarus	Merged with Bilten, Filzbach, Mühlehorn, Näfels, Niederurnen, Oberurnen and Obstalden	Glarus Nord	2011
Mon	Grisons	Merged with Alvaneu, Alvaschein, Brienz/Brinzauls, Stierva, Surava and Tiefencastel	Albula/Alvra	2015
Monible	Bern	Merged with Châtelat, Sornetan and Souboz	Petit-Val	2015
Monnaz	Vaud	Incorporated into Echichens	Echichens	2011
Montagnola	Ticino	Merged with Agra and Gentilino	Collina d'Oro	2004
Montagny-la-Ville	Fribourg	Merged with Montagny-les-Monts	Montagny	2000
Montagny-les-Monts	Fribourg	Merged with Montagny-la-Ville	Montagny	2000
Montalchez	Neuchâtel	Merged with Bevaix, Fresens, Gorgier, Saint-Aubin-Sauges and Vaumarcus	La Grande Béroche	2018
Montana	Valais	Merged with Chermignon, Mollens and Randogne	Crans-Montana	2017
Montaubion-Chardonney	Vaud	Merged with Peney-le-Jorat, Sottens, Villars-Mendraz and Villars-Tiercelin	Jorat-Menthue	2011
Montborget	Fribourg	Incorporated into Murist	Murist	1981
Montbovon	Fribourg	Merged with Albeuve, Lessoc and Neirivue	Haut-Intyamon	2002
Montbrelloz	Fribourg	Merged with Autavaux and Forel	Vernay	2006
Monte	Ticino	Incorporated into Castel San Pietro	Castel San Pietro	2004
Monte Carasso	Ticino	Incorporated into Bellinzona	Bellinzona	2017
Montécu	Fribourg	Incorporated into Bonnefontaine	Bonnefontaine	1989
Monteggio	Ticino	Merged with Croglio, Ponte Tresa and Sessa	Tresa	2021
Montenol	Jura	Merged with Epauvillers, Epiquerez, Montmelon, Ocourt, Saint-Ursanne and Seleute	Clos du Doubs	2009
Monterschu	Fribourg	Merged with Grossgurmels	Gurmels	1978
Montet	Fribourg	Merged with Aumont, Frasses and Granges-de-Vesin	Les Montets	2004
Montet	Fribourg	Incorporated into Ursy	Ursy	2025
Montévraz	Fribourg	Merged with Bonnefontaine, Essert, Oberried, Praroman and Zénauva	Le Mouret	2003
Montfavergier	Jura	Incorporated into Montfaucon	Montfaucon	2009
Montherod	Vaud	Incorporated into Aubonne	Aubonne	2021
Montignez	Jura	Merged with Buix and Courtemaîche	Basse-Allaine	2009
Montmagny	Vaud	Merged with Bellerive, Chabrey, Constantine, Mur, Vallamand and Villars-le-Grand	Vully-les-Lacs	2011
Montmelon	Jura	Merged with Epauvillers, Epiquerez, Montenol, Ocourt, Saint-Ursanne and Seleute	Clos du Doubs	2009
Montmollin	Neuchâtel	Merged with Boudevilliers, Cernier, Chézard-Saint-Martin, Coffrane, Dombresson, Engollon, Fenin-Vilars-Saules, Fontainemelon, Fontaines, Le Pâquier, Les Geneveys-sur-Coffrane, Les Hauts-Geneveys, Savagnier and Villiers	Val-de-Ruz	2013
Montreux-Châtelard	Vaud	Merged with Montreux-Planches	Montreux	1962
Montreux-Planches	Vaud	Merged with Montreux-Châtelard	Montreux	1962
Montsevelier	Jura	Merged with Vermes and Vicques	Val Terbi	2013
Montvoie	Bern	Incorporated into Ocourt	Ocourt	1882
Morbio Superiore	Ticino	Merged with Bruzella, Cabbio, Caneggio, Muggio and Sagno	Breggia	2009
Morcles	Vaud	Merged with Lavey	Lavey-Morcles	1852
Mörel	Valais	Merged with Filet	Mörel-Filet	2009
Morens	Fribourg	Merged with Bussy, Estavayer-le-Lac, Murist, Rueyres-les-Prés, Vernay and Vuissens	Estavayer	2017
Morissen	Grisons	Merged with Cumbel, Degen, Lumbrein, Suraua, Vella, Vignogn and Vrin	Lumnezia	2013
Morlens	Fribourg	Incorporated into Vuarmarens	Vuarmarens	1991
Mosen	Lucerne	Incorporated into Hitzkirch	Hitzkirch	2009
Mosogno	Ticino	Incorporated into Onsernone	Onsernone	2016
Mossel	Fribourg	Incorporated into Ursy	Ursy	2001
Môtiers	Neuchâtel	Merged with Boveresse, Buttes, Couvet, Fleurier, Les Bayards, Noiraigue, Saint-Sulpice and Travers	Val-de-Travers	2009
Mötschwil	Bern	Incorporated into Hindelbank	Hindelbank	2021
Mugena	Ticino	Merged with Arosio, Breno, Fescoggia and Vezio	Alto Malcantone	2005
Muggio	Ticino	Merged with Bruzella, Cabbio, Caneggio, Morbio Superiore and Sagno	Breggia	2009
Mühlebach	Valais	Incorporated into Ernen	Ernen	2004
Mühlebach bei Amriswil	Thurgau	Incorporated into Amriswil	Amriswil	1932
Mühledorf	Bern	Incorporated into Kirchdorf	Kirchdorf	2018
Mühledorf	Solothurn	Merged with Aetigkofen, Aetingen, Bibern, Brügglen, Gossliwil, Hessigkofen, Küttigkofen, Kyburg-Buchegg and Tscheppach	Buchegg	2014
Mühlehorn	Glarus	Merged with Bilten, Filzbach, Mollis, Näfels, Niederurnen, Oberurnen and Obstalden	Glarus Nord	2011
Mühlethal	Aargau	Incorporated into Zofingen	Zofingen	2002
Mühlethurnen	Bern	Merged with Kirchenthurnen and Lohnstorf	Thurnen	2020
Mülchi	Bern	Incorporated into Fraubrunnen	Fraubrunnen	2014
Mulegns	Grisons	Merged with Bivio, Cunter, Marmorera, Riom-Parsonz, Salouf, Savognin, Sur and Tinizong-Rona	Surses	2016
Mullen	Bern	Incorporated into Tschugg	Tschugg	1946
Münchringen	Bern	Incorporated into Jegenstorf	Jegenstorf	2014
Mund	Valais	Incorporated into Naters	Naters	2013
Mundaun	Grisons	Merged with Obersaxen	Obersaxen Mundaun	2016
Münster	Valais	Merged with Geschinen	Münster-Geschinen	2004
Münster-Geschinen	Valais	Merged with Blitzingen, Grafschaft, Niederwald and Reckingen-Gluringen	Goms	2017
Mur	Vaud	Merged with Bellerive, Chabrey, Constantine, Montmagny, Vallamand and Villars-le-Grand	Vully-les-Lacs	2011
Murist	Fribourg	Merged with Bussy, Estavayer-le-Lac, Morens, Rueyres-les-Prés, Vernay and Vuissens	Estavayer	2017
Müstair	Grisons	Merged with Fuldera, Lü, Santa Maria Val Müstair, Tschierv and Valchava	Val Müstair	2009
Müswangen	Lucerne	Incorporated into Hitzkirch	Hitzkirch	2009
Mutten	Grisons	Incorporated into Thusis	Thusis	2018
Näfels	Glarus	Merged with Bilten, Filzbach, Mollis, Mühlehorn, Niederurnen, Oberurnen and Obstalden	Glarus Nord	2011
Nax	Valais	Merged with Mase and Vernamiège	Mont-Noble	2011
Naz	Vaud	Merged with Dommartin, Poliez-le-Grand and Sugnens	Montilliez	2011
Neirivue	Fribourg	Merged with Albeuve, Lessoc and Montbovon	Haut-Intyamon	2002
Nennigkofen	Solothurn	Merged with Lüsslingen	Lüsslingen-Nennigkofen	2013
Nesselnbach	Aargau	Incorporated into Niederwil	Niederwil	1901
Nesslau	St. Gallen	Merged with Krummenau	Nesslau-Krummenau	2005
Nesslau-Krummenau	St. Gallen	Merged with Stein	Nesslau	2013
Netstal	Glarus	Incorporated into Glarus	Glarus	2011
Neudorf	Lucerne	Incorporated into Beromünster	Beromünster	2013
Neuhaus	Fribourg	Incorporated into Plasselb	Plasselb	1971
Neukirch an der Thur	Thurgau	Merged with Buhwil, Kradolf and Schönenberg an der Thur	Kradolf-Schönenberg	1996
Neuwilen	Thurgau	Merged with Alterswilen, Altishausen, Dotnacht, Ellighausen, Hugelshofen, Lippoldswilen and Siegershausen	Kemmental	1996
Neyruz-sur-Moudon	Vaud	Merged with Chanéaz, Chapelle-sur-Moudon, Correvon, Denezy, Martherenges, Peyres-Possens, Saint-Cierges and Thierrens	Montanaire	2013
Nidfurn	Glarus	Incorporated into Haslen	Haslen	2006
Niedererlinsbach	Solothurn	Merged with Obererlinsbach	Erlinsbach	2006
Niederernen	Valais	Incorporated into Ernen	Ernen	1872
Niederneunforn	Thurgau	Incorporated into Neunforn	Neunforn	1996
Niederösch	Bern	Incorporated into Ersigen	Ersigen	2016
Niederried bei Kallnach	Bern	Incorporated into Kallnach	Kallnach	2013
Niedersommeri	Thurgau	Merged with Obersommeri	Sommeri	1967
Niederstocken	Bern	Merged with Höfen bei Thun and Oberstocken	Stocken-Höfen	2014
Niederurdorf	Zürich	Merged with Oberurdorf	Urdorf	1931
Niederurnen	Glarus	Merged with Bilten, Filzbach, Mollis, Mühlehorn, Näfels, Oberurnen and Obstalden	Glarus Nord	2011
Niederwald	Valais	Merged with Blitzingen, Grafschaft, Münster-Geschinen and Reckingen-Gluringen	Goms	2017
Niederwichtrach	Bern	Merged with Oberwichtrach	Wichtrach	2004
Niederwil	Solothurn	Incorporated into Riedholz	Riedholz	2011
Niederwil	Thurgau	Incorporated into Gachnang	Gachnang	1998
Nierlet-les-Bois	Fribourg	Incorporated into Ponthaux	Ponthaux	1981
Noflen	Bern	Incorporated into Kirchdorf	Kirchdorf	2018
Noiraigue	Neuchâtel	Merged with Boveresse, Buttes, Couvet, Fleurier, Les Bayards, Môtiers, Saint-Sulpice and Travers	Val-de-Travers	2009
Noranco	Ticino	Merged with Pambio	Pambio-Noranco	1904
Noréaz	Fribourg	Merged with Corserey and Prez-vers-Noréaz	Prez	2020
Novaggio	Ticino	Merged with Astano, Bedigliora, Curio and Miglieglia	Lema	2025
Nufenen	Grisons	Merged with Hinterrhein and Splügen	Rheinwald	2019
Nussbaumen	Thurgau	Incorporated into Hüttwilen	Hüttwilen	1997
Oberaach	Thurgau	Incorporated into Amriswil	Amriswil	1979
Oberbözberg	Aargau	Merged with Gallenkirch, Linn and Unterbözberg	Bözberg	2013
Oberbussnang	Thurgau	Incorporated into Bussnang	Bussnang	1996
Oberehrendingen	Aargau	Merged with Unterehrendingen	Ehrendingen	2006
Obererlinsbach	Solothurn	Merged with Niedererlinsbach	Erlinsbach	2006
Oberflachs	Aargau	Merged with Schinznach-Dorf	Schinznach	2014
Obergesteln	Valais	Merged with Oberwald and Ulrichen	Obergoms	2009
Oberhelfenschwil	St. Gallen	Incorporated into Neckertal	Neckertal	2023
Oberhofen	Aargau	Merged with Etzgen, Hottwil, Mettau and Wil	Mettauertal	2010
Oberhofen bei Kreuzlingen	Thurgau	Merged with Illighausen	Lengwil	1998
Oberhofen bei Münchwilen	Thurgau	Incorporated into Münchwilen	Münchwilen	1950
Oberleibstadt	Aargau	Merged with Unterleibstadt	Leibstadt	1866
Oberneunforn	Thurgau	Incorporated into Neunforn	Neunforn	1996
Oberönz	Bern	Incorporated into Herzogenbuchsee	Herzogenbuchsee	2008
Oberösch	Bern	Incorporated into Ersigen	Ersigen	2016
Oberramsern	Solothurn	Incorporated into Messen	Messen	2010
Oberried	Fribourg	Merged with Bonnefontaine, Essert, Montévraz, Praroman and Zénauva	Le Mouret	2003
Obersaxen	Grisons	Merged with Mundaun	Obersaxen Mundaun	2016
Oberscheunen	Bern	Merged with Messen-Scheunen	Scheunen	1912
Oberschrot	Fribourg	Incorporated into Plaffeien	Plaffeien	2017
Obersommeri	Thurgau	Merged with Niedersommeri	Sommeri	1967
Oberstammheim	Zürich	Merged with Unterstammheim and Waltalingen	Stammheim	2019
Obersteckholz	Bern	Incorporated into Langenthal	Langenthal	2021
Oberstocken	Bern	Merged with Höfen bei Thun and Niederstocken	Stocken-Höfen	2014
Oberstrass	Zürich	Incorporated into Zürich	Zürich	1893
Oberurdorf	Zürich	Merged with Niederurdorf	Urdorf	1931
Oberurnen	Glarus	Merged with Bilten, Filzbach, Mollis, Mühlehorn, Näfels, Niederurnen and Obstalden	Glarus Nord	2011
Oberwald	Valais	Merged with Obergesteln and Ulrichen	Obergoms	2009
Oberwangen	Thurgau	Incorporated into Fischingen	Fischingen	1972
Oberwichtrach	Bern	Merged with Niederwichtrach	Wichtrach	2004
Oberwil	Thurgau	Incorporated into Gachnang	Gachnang	1998
Oberwinterthur	Zürich	Incorporated into Winterthur	Winterthur	1922
Obstalden	Glarus	Merged with Bilten, Filzbach, Mollis, Mühlehorn, Näfels, Niederurnen and Oberurnen	Glarus Nord	2011
Ocourt	Jura	Merged with Epauvillers, Epiquerez, Montenol, Montmelon, Saint-Ursanne and Seleute	Clos du Doubs	2009
Oekingen	Solothurn	Incorporated into Kriegstetten	Kriegstetten	2026
Oerlikon	Zürich	Incorporated into Zürich	Zürich	1934
Oetlikon	Aargau	Incorporated into Würenlos	Würenlos	1900
Ohmstal	Lucerne	Incorporated into Schötz	Schötz	2013
Oleyres	Vaud	Incorporated into Avenches	Avenches	2011
Olivone	Ticino	Merged with Aquila, Campo Blenio, Ghirone and Torre	Blenio	2006
Olsberg	Basel-Country	Incorporated into Arisdorf	Arisdorf	1882
Onex-Confignon	Geneva	Split in two	Onex; Confignon	1851
Onnens	Fribourg	Merged with Lentigny and Lovens	La Brillaz	2001
Opfershofen	Thurgau	Incorporated into Bürglen	Bürglen	1995
Opfertshofen	Schaffhausen	Incorporated into Thayngen	Thayngen	2009
Oppikon	Thurgau	Incorporated into Bussnang	Bussnang	1996
Oron-la-Ville	Vaud	Merged with Bussigny-sur-Oron, Châtillens, Chesalles-sur-Oron, Écoteaux, Les Tavernes, Les Thioleyres, Oron-le-Châtel, Palézieux and Vuibroye	Oron	2012
Oron-le-Châtel	Vaud	Merged with Bussigny-sur-Oron, Châtillens, Chesalles-sur-Oron, Écoteaux, Les Tavernes, Les Thioleyres, Oron-la-Ville, Palézieux and Vuibroye	Oron	2012
Orsonnens	Fribourg	Merged with Chavannes-sous-Orsonnens, Villargiroud and Villarsiviriaux	Villorsonnens	2001
Osco	Ticino	Incorporated into Faido	Faido	2012
Osogna	Ticino	Merged with Cresciano, Iragna and Lodrino	Riviera	2017
Osterfingen	Schaffhausen	Incorporated into Wilchingen	Wilchingen	2005
Otterbach	Bern	Merged with Ausserbirrmoos and Innerbirrmoos	Linden	1946
Ottoberg	Thurgau	Incorporated into Märstetten	Märstetten	1975
Oulens-sur-Lucens	Vaud	Incorporated into Lucens	Lucens	2011
Pagig	Grisons	Merged with St. Peter	St. Peter-Pagig	2008
Palagnedra	Ticino	Merged with Borgnone and Intragna	Centovalli	2009
Palézieux	Vaud	Merged with Bussigny-sur-Oron, Châtillens, Chesalles-sur-Oron, Écoteaux, Les Tavernes, Les Thioleyres, Oron-la-Ville, Oron-le-Châtel and Vuibroye	Oron	2012
Pambio	Ticino	Merged with Noranco	Pambio-Noranco	1904
Pambio-Noranco	Ticino	Incorporated into Lugano	Lugano	2004
Pampigny	Vaud	Merged with Apples, Bussy-Chardonney, Cottens, Reverolle and Sévery	Hautemorges	2021
Pany	Grisons	Incorporated into Luzein	Luzein	1872
Parpan	Grisons	Incorporated into Churwalden	Churwalden	2010
Parsonz	Grisons	Merged with Riom	Riom-Parsonz	1979
Paspels	Grisons	Merged with Almens, Pratval, Rodels and Tomils	Domleschg	2015
Patzen-Fardün	Grisons	Merged with Donath	Donat	2003
Pazzallo	Ticino	Incorporated into Lugano	Lugano	2004
Peccia	Ticino	Merged with Broglio, Brontallo, Fusio, Menzonio and Prato-Sornico	Lavizzara	2004
Pedrinate	Ticino	Incorporated into Chiasso	Chiasso	1976
Peiden	Grisons	Merged with Uors	Uors-Peiden	1963
Peist	Grisons	Incorporated into Arosa	Arosa	2013
Peney-le-Jorat	Vaud	Merged with Montaubion-Chardonney, Sottens, Villars-Mendraz and Villars-Tiercelin	Jorat-Menthue	2011
Péry	Bern	Merged with La Heutte	Péry-la-Heutte	2015
Peseux	Neuchâtel	Incorporated into Neuchâtel	Neuchâtel	2021
Peyres-Possens	Vaud	Merged with Chanéaz, Chapelle-sur-Moudon, Correvon, Denezy, Martherenges, Neyruz-sur-Moudon, Saint-Cierges and Thierrens	Montanaire	2013
Pfeffikon	Lucerne	Incorporated into Rickenbach	Rickenbach	2013
Piandera	Ticino	Merged with Colla, Insone, Scareglia and Signôra	Valcolla	1956
Pianezzo	Ticino	Incorporated into Bellinzona	Bellinzona	2017
Piazzogna	Ticino	Merged with Caviano, Contone, Gerra, Indemini, Magadino, San Nazzaro, Sant'Abbondio and Vira	Gambarogno	2010
Pignia	Grisons	Incorporated into Andeer	Andeer	2009
Pigniu	Grisons	Merged with Castrisch, Duvin, Ilanz, Ladir, Luven, Pitasch, Riein, Rueun, Ruschein, Schnaus, Sevgein and Siat	Ilanz/Glion	2014
Pitasch	Grisons	Merged with Castrisch, Duvin, Ilanz, Ladir, Luven, Pigniu, Riein, Rueun, Ruschein, Schnaus, Sevgein and Siat	Ilanz/Glion	2014
Pizy	Vaud	Incorporated into Aubonne	Aubonne	2011
Plagne	Bern	Merged with Vauffelin	Sauge	2014
Plainpalais	Geneva	Incorporated into Geneva	Geneva	1931
Plamboz	Neuchâtel	Merged with Brot-Dessus	Brot-Plamboz	1875
Pleujouse	Jura	Merged with Asuel, Charmoille, Fregiécourt and Miécourt	La Baroche	2009
Poliez-le-Grand	Vaud	Merged with Dommartin, Naz and Sugnens	Montilliez	2011
Pont	Fribourg	Merged with Bouloz and Porsel	Le Flon	2004
Pont-en-Ogoz	Fribourg	Merged with Villars-d'Avry	Le Bry	1970
Ponte Tresa	Ticino	Merged with Croglio, Monteggio and Sessa	Tresa	2021
Pontenet	Bern	Merged with Bévilard and Malleray	Valbirse	2015
Ponthaux	Fribourg	Merged with Grolley	Grolley-Ponthaux	2025
Ponto Valentino	Ticino	Merged with Castro, Corzoneso, Dongio, Largario, Leontica, Lottigna, Marolta and Prugiasco	Acquarossa	2004
Porsel	Fribourg	Merged with Bouloz and Pont	Le Flon	2004
Portalban	Fribourg	Merged with Delley	Delley-Portalban	2005
Portein	Grisons	Incorporated into Cazis	Cazis	2010
Posat	Fribourg	Merged with Farvagny-le-Grand, Farvagny-le-Petit and Grenilles	Farvagny	1996
Posieux	Fribourg	Merged with Ecuvillens	Hauterive	2001
Praden	Grisons	Merged with Tschiertschen	Tschiertschen-Praden	2009
Prahins	Vaud	Incorporated into Donneloye	Donneloye	2012
Praratoud	Fribourg	Incorporated into Surpierre	Surpierre	2005
Praroman	Fribourg	Merged with Bonnefontaine, Essert, Montévraz, Oberried and Zénauva	Le Mouret	2003
Prato	Ticino	Incorporated into Quinto	Quinto	2025
Prato	Ticino	Merged with Sornico	Prato-Sornico	1864
Prato-Sornico	Ticino	Merged with Broglio, Brontallo, Fusio, Menzonio and Peccia	Lavizzara	2004
Pratval	Grisons	Merged with Almens, Paspels, Rodels and Tomils	Domleschg	2015
Präz	Grisons	Incorporated into Cazis	Cazis	2010
Pregassona	Ticino	Incorporated into Lugano	Lugano	2004
Prêles	Bern	Merged with Diesse and Lamboing	Plateau de Diesse	2014
Preonzo	Ticino	Incorporated into Bellinzona	Bellinzona	2017
Prez-vers-Noréaz	Fribourg	Merged with Corserey and Noréaz	Prez	2020
Prez-vers-Siviriez	Fribourg	Incorporated into Siviriez	Siviriez	2004
Progens	Fribourg	Merged with Grattavache and Le Crêt	La Verrerie	2004
Promasens	Fribourg	Incorporated into Rue	Rue	2001
Prugiasco	Ticino	Merged with Castro, Corzoneso, Dongio, Largario, Leontica, Lottigna, Marolta and Ponto Valentino	Acquarossa	2004
Putz	Grisons	Incorporated into Luzein	Luzein	1872
Raat-Schüpfheim	Zürich	Incorporated into Stadel	Stadel	1907
Ramosch	Grisons	Merged with Tschlin	Valsot	2013
Rancate	Ticino	Incorporated into Mendrisio	Mendrisio	2009
Randogne	Valais	Merged with Chermignon, Mollens and Montana	Crans-Montana	2017
Rapperswil	St. Gallen	Merged with Jona	Rapperswil-Jona	2007
Rasa	Ticino	Incorporated into Intragna	Intragna	1972
Räuchlisberg	Thurgau	Incorporated into Amriswil	Amriswil	1979
Ravecchia	Ticino	Incorporated into Bellinzona	Bellinzona	1907
Rebeuvelier	Jura	Incorporated into Courrendlin	Courrendlin	2019
Reckingen	Valais	Merged with Gluringen	Reckingen-Gluringen	2004
Reckingen-Gluringen	Valais	Merged with Blitzingen, Grafschaft, Münster-Geschinen and Niederwald	Goms	2017
Réclère	Jura	Merged with Chevenez, Damvant and Roche-d'Or	Haute-Ajoie	2009
Reiben	Bern	Incorporated into Büren an der Aare	Büren an der Aare	1911
Rein	Aargau	Incorporated into Rüfenach	Rüfenach	1898
Reischen	Grisons	Merged with Zillis	Zillis-Reischen	1875
Rekingen	Aargau	Merged with Bad Zurzach, Baldingen, Böbikon, Kaiserstuhl, Rietheim, Rümikon and Wislikofen	Zurzach	2022
Retschwil	Lucerne	Incorporated into Hitzkirch	Hitzkirch	2009
Retterswil	Aargau	Incorporated into Seon	Seon	1899
Reuti	Thurgau	Incorporated into Bussnang	Bussnang	1996
Reverolle	Vaud	Merged with Apples, Bussy-Chardonney, Cottens, Pampigny and Sévery	Hautemorges	2021
Rheinklingen	Thurgau	Incorporated into Wagenhausen	Wagenhausen	1995
Richensee	Lucerne	Incorporated into Hitzkirch	Hitzkirch	1897
Richenthal	Lucerne	Incorporated into Reiden	Reiden	2006
Ried-Mörel	Valais	Merged with Goppisberg and Greich	Riederalp	2003
Rieden	St. Gallen	Incorporated into Gommiswald	Gommiswald	2013
Rieden	Zürich	Incorporated into Wallisellen	Wallisellen	1916
Riedern	Glarus	Incorporated into Glarus	Glarus	2011
Riedt	Thurgau	Incorporated into Erlen	Erlen	1995
Riein	Grisons	Merged with Castrisch, Duvin, Ilanz, Ladir, Luven, Pigniu, Pitasch, Rueun, Ruschein, Schnaus, Sevgein and Siat	Ilanz/Glion	2014
Riesbach	Zürich	Incorporated into Zürich	Zürich	1893
Rietheim	Aargau	Merged with Bad Zurzach, Baldingen, Böbikon, Kaiserstuhl, Rekingen, Rümikon and Wislikofen	Zurzach	2022
Riex	Vaud	Merged with Cully, Epesses, Grandvaux and Villette	Bourg-en-Lavaux	2011
Riken	Aargau	Merged with Balzenwil	Murgenthal	1901
Rinkenbach	Appenzell; Innerrhoden	Split in three	Appenzell; Gonten; Schlatt-Haslen	1872
Riom	Grisons	Merged with Parsonz	Riom-Parsonz	1979
Riom-Parsonz	Grisons	Merged with Bivio, Cunter, Marmorera, Mulegns, Salouf, Savognin, Sur and Tinizong-Rona	Surses	2016
Ritzingen	Valais	Merged with Biel and Selkingen	Grafschaft	2000
Rivera	Ticino	Merged with Bironico, Camignolo, Medeglia and Sigirino	Monteceneri	2010
Robasacco	Ticino	Incorporated into Cadenazzo	Cadenazzo	2005
Roche-d'Or	Jura	Merged with Chevenez, Damvant and Réclère	Haute-Ajoie	2009
Rocourt	Jura	Incorporated into Haute-Ajoie	Haute-Ajoie	2018
Rodels	Grisons	Merged with Almens, Paspels, Pratval and Tomils	Domleschg	2015
Rohr	Aargau	Incorporated into Aarau	Aarau	2010
Rohr	Solothurn	Incorporated into Stüsslingen	Stüsslingen	2021
Rohrdorf	Aargau	Split in three	Niederrohrdorf; Oberrohrdorf; Remetschwil	1854
Romainmôtier	Vaud	Merged with Envy	Romainmôtier-Envy	1970
Romairon	Vaud	Merged with Fontanezier, Vaugondry and Villars-Burquin	Tévenon	2011
Romanens	Fribourg	Merged with Maules, Rueyres-Treyfayes and Sâles (Gruyère)	Sâles	2001
Rona	Grisons	Merged with Tinizong	Tinizong-Rona	1998
Rossens	Fribourg	Merged with Corpataux-Magnedens, Farvagny, Le Glèbe and Vuisternens-en-Ogoz	Gibloux	2016
Rossens	Vaud	Incorporated into Villarzel	Villarzel	2006
Rossura	Ticino	Incorporated into Faido	Faido	2006
Röthenbach bei Herzogenbuchsee	Bern	Incorporated into Heimenhausen	Heimenhausen	2009
Rothenhausen	Thurgau	Incorporated into Bussnang	Bussnang	1996
Roveredo	Ticino	Merged with Cagiallo, Lopagno, Sala Capriasca, Tesserete and Vaglio	Capriasca	2001
Rovio	Ticino	Merged with Maroggia and Melano	Val Mara	2022
Rubigen Gesamtgemeinde	Bern	Split in three	Rubigen; Allmendingen bei Bern; Trimstein	1993
Rueun	Grisons	Merged with Castrisch, Duvin, Ilanz, Ladir, Luven, Pigniu, Pitasch, Riein, Ruschein, Schnaus, Sevgein and Siat	Ilanz/Glion	2014
Rueyres-les-Prés	Fribourg	Merged with Bussy, Estavayer-le-Lac, Morens, Murist, Vernay and Vuissens	Estavayer	2017
Rueyres-Saint-Laurent	Fribourg	Merged with Estavayer-le-Gibloux, Villarlod and Villarsel-le-Gibloux	Le Glèbe	2003
Rueyres-Treyfayes	Fribourg	Merged with Maules, Romanens and Sâles (Gruyère)	Sâles	2001
Rümikon	Aargau	Merged with Bad Zurzach, Baldingen, Böbikon, Kaiserstuhl, Rekingen, Rietheim and Wislikofen	Zurzach	2022
Rümligen	Bern	Incorporated into Riggisberg	Riggisberg	2021
Ruppoldsried	Bern	Incorporated into Rapperswil	Rapperswil	2013
Ruschein	Grisons	Merged with Castrisch, Duvin, Ilanz, Ladir, Luven, Pigniu, Pitasch, Riein, Rueun, Schnaus, Sevgein and Siat	Ilanz/Glion	2014
Russo	Ticino	Merged with Comologno and Crana	Onsernone	1995
Russy	Fribourg	Merged with Domdidier, Dompierre and Léchelles	Belmont-Broye	2016
Rüte	Appenzell Innerrhoden	Merged with Schwende	Schwende-Rüte	2022
Rüti	Glarus	Merged with Betschwanden, Braunwald, Elm, Engi, Haslen, Linthal, Luchsingen, Matt, Mitlödi, Schwanden, Schwändi and Sool	Glarus Süd	2011
Rüti bei Riggisberg	Bern	Incorporated into Riggisberg	Riggisberg	2009
Saas im Prättigau	Grisons	Incorporated into Klosters	Klosters	2016
Safien	Grisons	Merged with Tenna, Valendas and Versam	Safiental	2013
Sagno	Ticino	Merged with Bruzella, Cabbio, Caneggio, Morbio Superiore and Muggio	Breggia	2009
Saint-Aubin	Neuchâtel	Merged with Sauges	Saint-Aubin-Sauges	1888
Saint-Aubin-Sauges	Neuchâtel	Merged with Bevaix, Fresens, Gorgier, Montalchez and Vaumarcus	La Grande Béroche	2018
Saint-Blaise	Neuchâtel	Merged with Enges, Hauterive and La Tène	Laténa	2025
Saint-Cierges	Vaud	Merged with Chanéaz, Chapelle-sur-Moudon, Correvon, Denezy, Martherenges, Neyruz-sur-Moudon, Peyres-Possens and Thierrens	Montanaire	2013
Saint-Jean	Valais	Merged with Ayer, Chandolin, Grimentz, Saint-Luc and Vissoie	Anniviers	2009
Saint-Légier-La Chiésaz	Vaud	Merged with Blonay	Blonay – Saint-Légier	2022
Saint-Luc	Valais	Merged with Ayer, Chandolin, Grimentz, Saint-Jean and Vissoie	Anniviers	2009
Saint-Saphorin-sur-Morges	Vaud	Incorporated into Echichens	Echichens	2011
Saint-Sulpice	Neuchâtel	Merged with Boveresse, Buttes, Couvet, Fleurier, Les Bayards, Môtiers, Noiraigue and Travers	Val-de-Travers	2009
Saint-Ursanne	Jura	Merged with Epauvillers, Epiquerez, Montenol, Montmelon, Ocourt and Seleute	Clos du Doubs	2009
Sala Capriasca	Ticino	Merged with Cagiallo, Lopagno, Roveredo, Tesserete and Vaglio	Capriasca	2001
Salen-Reutenen	Thurgau	Incorporated into Homburg	Homburg	1999
Sâles (Gruyère)	Fribourg	Merged with Maules, Romanens and Rueyres-Treyfayes	Sâles	2001
Sales	Fribourg	Incorporated into Ependes	Ependes	1977
Salins	Valais	Incorporated into Sion	Sion	2013
Salorino	Ticino	Incorporated into Mendrisio	Mendrisio	2004
Salouf	Grisons	Merged with Bivio, Cunter, Marmorera, Mulegns, Riom-Parsonz, Savognin, Sur and Tinizong-Rona	Surses	2016
Salvenach	Fribourg	Incorporated into Murten	Murten	2016
San Nazzaro	Ticino	Merged with Caviano, Contone, Gerra, Indemini, Magadino, Piazzogna, Sant'Abbondio and Vira	Gambarogno	2010
Sant'Abbondio	Ticino	Merged with Caviano, Contone, Gerra, Indemini, Magadino, Piazzogna, San Nazzaro and Vira	Gambarogno	2010
Sant'Antonio	Ticino	Incorporated into Bellinzona	Bellinzona	2017
Santa Domenica	Grisons	Incorporated into Rossa	Rossa	1982
Santa Maria Val Müstair	Grisons	Merged with Fuldera, Lü, Müstair, Tschierv and Valchava	Val Müstair	2009
Sarn	Grisons	Incorporated into Cazis	Cazis	2010
Sarzens	Vaud	Incorporated into Lucens	Lucens	2017
Sassel	Vaud	Merged with Cerniaz, Combremont-le-Grand, Combremont-le-Petit, Granges-près-Marnand, Marnand, Seigneux and Villars-Bramard	Valbroye	2011
Sauges	Neuchâtel	Merged with Saint-Aubin	Saint-Aubin-Sauges	1888
Saules	Neuchâtel	Merged with Fenin and Vilars	Fenin-Vilars-Saules	1875
Savagnier	Neuchâtel	Merged with Boudevilliers, Cernier, Chézard-Saint-Martin, Coffrane, Dombresson, Engollon, Fenin-Vilars-Saules, Fontainemelon, Fontaines, Le Pâquier, Les Geneveys-sur-Coffrane, Les Hauts-Geneveys, Montmollin and Villiers	Val-de-Ruz	2013
Savognin	Grisons	Merged with Bivio, Cunter, Marmorera, Mulegns, Riom-Parsonz, Salouf, Sur and Tinizong-Rona	Surses	2016
Says	Grisons	Incorporated into Trimmis	Trimmis	2008
Scareglia	Ticino	Merged with Colla, Insone, Piandera and Signôra	Valcolla	1956
Schachen	Lucerne	Incorporated into Werthenstein	Werthenstein	1889
Schalunen	Bern	Incorporated into Fraubrunnen	Fraubrunnen	2014
Scheid	Grisons	Merged with Feldis/Veulden, Trans and Tumegl/Tomils	Tomils	2009
Scherz	Aargau	Incorporated into Lupfig	Lupfig	2018
Scherzingen	Thurgau	Split in two, one part merged with Landschlacht	Bottighofen (split from Scherzingen); Münsterlingen (the rest of Scherzingen plus Landschlacht)	1994
Scheunen	Bern	Incorporated into Jegenstorf	Jegenstorf	2014
Schinznach-Bad	Aargau	Incorporated into Brugg	Brugg	2020
Schinznach-Dorf	Aargau	Merged with Oberflachs	Schinznach	2014
Schlans	Grisons	Incorporated into Trun	Trun	2012
Schlattingen	Thurgau	Merged with Basadingen	Basadingen-Schlattingen	1999
Schlosswil	Bern	Incorporated into Grosshöchstetten	Grosshöchstetten	2018
Schnaus	Grisons	Merged with Castrisch, Duvin, Ilanz, Ladir, Luven, Pigniu, Pitasch, Riein, Rueun, Ruschein, Sevgein and Siat	Ilanz/Glion	2014
Schocherswil	Thurgau	Incorporated into Amriswil	Amriswil	1997
Schönenbaumgarten	Thurgau	Incorporated into Langrickenbach	Langrickenbach	1998
Schönenberg	Zürich	Incorporated into Wädenswil	Wädenswil	2019
Schönenberg an der Thur	Thurgau	Merged with Buhwil, Kradolf and Neukirch an der Thur	Kradolf-Schönenberg	1996
Schönthal	Bern	Incorporated into Ausserbirrmoos	Ausserbirrmoos	1888
Schoren	Bern	Incorporated into Langenthal	Langenthal	1898
Schottikon	Zürich	Incorporated into Elsau	Elsau	1922
Schuders	Grisons	Incorporated into Schiers	Schiers	1872
Schwamendingen	Zürich	Incorporated into Zürich	Zürich	1934
Schwanden	Glarus	Merged with Betschwanden, Braunwald, Elm, Engi, Haslen, Linthal, Luchsingen, Matt, Mitlödi, Rüti, Schwändi and Sool	Glarus Süd	2011
Schwändi	Glarus	Merged with Betschwanden, Braunwald, Elm, Engi, Haslen, Linthal, Luchsingen, Matt, Mitlödi, Rüti, Schwanden and Sool	Glarus Süd	2011
Schwarzenbach	Lucerne	Incorporated into Beromünster	Beromünster	2004
Schweizersholz	Thurgau	Incorporated into Bischofszell	Bischofszell	1996
Schwende	Appenzell Innerrhoden	Merged with Rüte	Schwende-Rüte	2022
Schwendibach	Bern	Incorporated into Steffisburg	Steffisburg	2020
Sculms	Grisons	Incorporated into Versam	Versam	1854
Sédeilles	Vaud	Incorporated into Villarzel	Villarzel	2006
Seebach	Zürich	Incorporated into Zürich	Zürich	1934
Seen	Zürich	Incorporated into Winterthur	Winterthur	1922
Seigneux	Vaud	Merged with Cerniaz, Combremont-le-Grand, Combremont-le-Petit, Granges-près-Marnand, Marnand, Sassel and Villars-Bramard	Valbroye	2011
Seiry	Fribourg	Incorporated into Lully	Lully	2006
Seleute	Jura	Merged with Epauvillers, Epiquerez, Montenol, Montmelon, Ocourt and Saint-Ursanne	Clos du Doubs	2009
Selkingen	Valais	Merged with Biel and Ritzingen	Grafschaft	2000
Selma	Grisons	Merged with Arvigo, Braggio and Cauco	Calanca	2015
Sementina	Ticino	Incorporated into Bellinzona	Bellinzona	2017
Semione	Ticino	Merged with Ludiano and Malvaglia	Serravalle	2012
Senèdes	Fribourg	Merged with Arconciel and Épendes	Bois-d'Amont	2021
Sent	Grisons	Incorporated into Scuol	Scuol	2015
Serneus	Grisons	Incorporated into Klosters	Klosters	1872
Sessa	Ticino	Merged with Croglio, Monteggio and Ponte Tresa	Tresa	2021
Sévery	Vaud	Merged with Apples, Bussy-Chardonney, Cottens, Pampigny and Reverolle	Hautemorges	2021
Sevgein	Grisons	Merged with Castrisch, Duvin, Ilanz, Ladir, Luven, Pigniu, Pitasch, Riein, Rueun, Ruschein, Schnaus and Siat	Ilanz/Glion	2014
Siat	Grisons	Merged with Castrisch, Duvin, Ilanz, Ladir, Luven, Pigniu, Pitasch, Riein, Rueun, Ruschein, Schnaus and Sevgein	Ilanz/Glion	2014
Siegershausen	Thurgau	Merged with Alterswilen, Altishausen, Dotnacht, Ellighausen, Hugelshofen, Lippoldswilen and Neuwilen	Kemmental	1996
Sigg	Grisons	Incorporated into Valzeina	Valzeina	1875
Sigirino	Ticino	Merged with Bironico, Camignolo, Medeglia and Rivera	Monteceneri	2010
Signôra	Ticino	Merged with Colla, Insone, Piandera and Scareglia	Valcolla	1956
Sitterdorf	Thurgau	Merged with Zihlschlacht	Zihlschlacht-Sitterdorf	1997
Sobrio	Ticino	Incorporated into Faido	Faido	2016
Soglio	Grisons	Merged with Bondo, Castasegna, Stampa and Vicosoprano	Bregaglia	2010
Solduno	Ticino	Incorporated into Locarno	Locarno	1928
Someo	Ticino	Incorporated into Maggia	Maggia	2004
Sommentier	Fribourg	Incorporated into Vuisternens-devant-Romont	Vuisternens-devant-Romont	2003
Sonogno	Ticino	Merged with Brione, Corippo, Cugnasco-Gerra (Gerra Valle), Frasco, Lavertezzo (Lavertezzo Valle) and Vogorno	Verzasca	2020
Sonterswil	Thurgau	Incorporated into Wäldi	Wäldi	1995
Sonvico	Ticino	Incorporated into Lugano	Lugano	2013
Sool	Glarus	Merged with Betschwanden, Braunwald, Elm, Engi, Haslen, Linthal, Luchsingen, Matt, Mitlödi, Rüti, Schwanden and Schwändi	Glarus Süd	2011
Sornetan	Bern	Merged with Châtelat, Monible and Souboz	Petit-Val	2015
Sornico	Ticino	Merged with Prato	Prato-Sornico	1864
Sottens	Vaud	Merged with Montaubion-Chardonney, Peney-le-Jorat, Villars-Mendraz and Villars-Tiercelin	Jorat-Menthue	2011
Souboz	Bern	Merged with Châtelat, Monible and Sornetan	Petit-Val	2015
Soulce	Jura	Merged with Bassecourt, Courfaivre, Glovelier and Undervelier	Haute-Sorne	2013
Splügen	Grisons	Merged with Hinterrhein and Nufenen	Rheinwald	2019
St. Antoni	Fribourg	Incorporated into Tafers	Tafers	2021
St. Antönien	Grisons	Incorporated into Luzein	Luzein	2016
St. Antönien Ascharina	Grisons	Incorporated into St. Antönien	St. Antönien	2007
St. Antönien Castels	Grisons	Merged with St. Antönien Rüti	St. Antönien	1979
St. Antönien Rüti	Grisons	Merged with St. Antönien Castels	St. Antönien	1979
St. Gallenkappel	St. Gallen	Incorporated into Eschenbach	Eschenbach	2013
St. Margarethen	Thurgau	Incorporated into Münchwilen	Münchwilen	1950
St. Martin	Grisons	Incorporated into Vals	Vals	2015
St. Niklaus Dorf	Valais	Merged with St. Niklaus Matt	St. Niklaus	1866
St. Niklaus Matt	Valais	Merged with St. Niklaus Dorf	St. Niklaus	1866
St. Peter	Grisons	Merged with Pagig	St. Peter-Pagig	2008
St. Peter-Pagig	Grisons	Incorporated into Arosa	Arosa	2013
St. Peterzell	St. Gallen	Merged with Brunnadern and Mogelsberg	Neckertal	2009
Stalden im Emmental	Bern	Merged with Gysenstein	Konolfingen	1933
Stampa	Grisons	Merged with Bondo, Castasegna, Soglio and Vicosoprano	Bregaglia	2010
Stechlenegg	Appenzell; Innerrhoden	Incorporated into Gonten	Gonten	1872
Steg	Valais	Merged with Hohtenn	Steg-Hohtenn	2008
Stein	St. Gallen	Merged with Nesslau-Krummenau	Nesslau	2013
Steinhaus	Valais	Incorporated into Ernen	Ernen	2004
Steinhof	Solothurn	Incorporated into Aeschi	Aeschi	2012
Sternenberg	Zürich	Incorporated into Bauma	Bauma	2015
Stierva	Grisons	Merged with Alvaneu, Alvaschein, Brienz/Brinzauls, Mon, Surava and Tiefencastel	Albula/Alvra	2015
Stilli	Aargau	Incorporated into Villigen	Villigen	2006
Strada	Grisons	Incorporated into Ilanz	Ilanz	1978
Strättligen	Bern	Incorporated into Thun	Thun	1920
Straubenzell	St. Gallen	Incorporated into St. Gallen	St. Gallen	1918
Strohwilen	Thurgau	Merged with Amlikon, Bissegg and Griesenberg	Amlikon-Bissegg	1995
Stuls	Grisons	Incorporated into Bergün/Bravuogn	Bergün/Bravuogn	1920
Sugnens	Vaud	Merged with Dommartin, Naz and Poliez-le-Grand	Montilliez	2011
Sulz	Aargau	Incorporated into Laufenburg	Laufenburg	2010
Sulz	Lucerne	Incorporated into Hitzkirch	Hitzkirch	2009
Sur	Grisons	Merged with Bivio, Cunter, Marmorera, Mulegns, Riom-Parsonz, Salouf, Savognin and Tinizong-Rona	Surses	2016
Suraua	Grisons	Merged with Cumbel, Degen, Lumbrein, Morissen, Vella, Vignogn and Vrin	Lumnezia	2013
Surava	Grisons	Merged with Alvaneu, Alvaschein, Brienz/Brinzauls, Mon, Stierva and Tiefencastel	Albula/Alvra	2015
Surava	Grisons	Merged with Brienz	Brienz-Surava	1869
Surcasti	Grisons	Merged with Camuns, Tersnaus and Uors-Peiden	Suraua	2002
Surcuolm	Grisons	Merged with Flond	Mundaun	2009
Susch	Grisons	Incorporated into Zernez	Zernez	2015
Tablat	St. Gallen	Incorporated into St. Gallen	St. Gallen	1918
Tägerschen	Thurgau	Merged with Tobel	Tobel-Tägerschen	1999
Tägertschi	Bern	Incorporated into Münsingen	Münsingen	2017
Tannegg	Thurgau	Incorporated into Fischingen	Fischingen	1972
Tannenbühl	Bern	Incorporated into Blumenstein	Blumenstein	1859
Tarasp	Grisons	Incorporated into Scuol	Scuol	2015
Tartar	Grisons	Incorporated into Cazis	Cazis	2010
Tegna	Ticino	Merged with Cavigliano and Verscio	Terre di Pedemonte	2013
Tenna	Grisons	Merged with Safien, Valendas and Versam	Safiental	2013
Tennwil	Aargau	Incorporated into Meisterschwanden	Meisterschwanden	1900
Tersnaus	Grisons	Merged with Camuns, Surcasti and Uors-Peiden	Suraua	2002
Tesserete	Ticino	Merged with Cagiallo, Lopagno, Roveredo, Sala Capriasca and Vaglio	Capriasca	2001
Thielle	Neuchâtel	Merged with Wavre	Thielle-Wavre	1888
Thielle-Wavre	Neuchâtel	Merged with Marin-Epagnier	La Tène	2009
Thierrens	Vaud	Merged with Chanéaz, Chapelle-sur-Moudon, Correvon, Denezy, Martherenges, Neyruz-sur-Moudon, Peyres-Possens and Saint-Cierges	Montanaire	2013
Thungschneit	Bern	Incorporated into Heimberg	Heimberg	1869
Tiefencastel	Grisons	Merged with Alvaneu, Alvaschein, Brienz/Brinzauls, Mon, Stierva and Surava	Albula/Alvra	2015
Tinizong	Grisons	Merged with Rona	Tinizong-Rona	1998
Tinizong-Rona	Grisons	Merged with Bivio, Cunter, Marmorera, Mulegns, Riom-Parsonz, Salouf, Savognin and Sur	Surses	2016
Tobel	Thurgau	Merged with Tägerschen	Tobel-Tägerschen	1999
Tomils	Grisons	Merged with Almens, Paspels, Pratval and Rodels	Domleschg	2015
Toos	Thurgau	Incorporated into Schönholzerswilen	Schönholzerswilen	1964
Torre	Ticino	Merged with Aquila, Campo Blenio, Ghirone and Olivone	Blenio	2006
Töss	Zürich	Incorporated into Winterthur	Winterthur	1922
Torny-le-Grand	Fribourg	Merged with Middes	Torny	2004
Tramelan-Dessous	Bern	Merged with Tramelan-Dessos	Tramelan	1952
Tramelan-Dessos	Bern	Merged with Tramelan-Dessous	Tramelan	1952
Trans	Grisons	Merged with Feldis/Veulden, Scheid and Tumegl/Tomils	Tomils	2009
Travers	Neuchâtel	Merged with Boveresse, Buttes, Couvet, Fleurier, Les Bayards, Môtiers, Noiraigue and Saint-Sulpice	Val-de-Travers	2009
Tremona	Ticino	Incorporated into Mendrisio	Mendrisio	2009
Triboltingen	Thurgau	Incorporated into Ermatingen	Ermatingen	1975
Trimstein	Bern	Incorporated into Münsingen	Münsingen	2013
Tscheppach	Solothurn	Merged with Aetigkofen, Aetingen, Bibern, Brügglen, Gossliwil, Hessigkofen, Küttigkofen, Kyburg-Buchegg and Mühledorf	Buchegg	2014
Tschiertschen	Grisons	Merged with Praden	Tschiertschen-Praden	2009
Tschiertschen-Praden	Grisons	Incorporated into Chur	Chur	2025
Tschierv	Grisons	Merged with Fuldera, Lü, Müstair, Santa Maria Val Müstair and Valchava	Val Müstair	2009
Tschlin	Grisons	Merged with Ramosch	Valsot	2013
Tumegl/Tomils	Grisons	Merged with Feldis/Veulden, Scheid and Trans	Tomils	2009
Turgi	Aargau	Incorporated into Baden	Baden	2024
Turtmann	Valais	Merged with Unterems	Turtmann-Unterems	2013
Tüscherz-Alfermée	Bern	Merged with Twann	Twann-Tüscherz	2010
Tuttwil	Thurgau	Incorporated into Wängi	Wängi	1969
Twann	Bern	Merged with Tüscherz-Alfermée	Twann-Tüscherz	2010
Ueken	Aargau	Merged with Herznach	Herznach-Ueken	2023
Uerschhausen	Thurgau	Incorporated into Hüttwilen	Hüttwilen	1997
Uesslingen	Thurgau	Merged with Buch bei Frauenfeld	Uesslingen-Buch	1995
Uffikon	Lucerne	Incorporated into Dagmersellen	Dagmersellen	2006
Ulmiz	Fribourg	Incorporated into Gurmels	Gurmels	2026
Ulrichen	Valais	Merged with Oberwald and Obergesteln	Obergoms	2009
Umiken	Aargau	Incorporated into Brugg	Brugg	2010
Undervelier	Jura	Merged with Bassecourt, Courfaivre, Glovelier and Soulce	Haute-Sorne	2013
Unterbözberg	Aargau	Merged with Gallenkirch, Linn and Oberbözberg	Bözberg	2013
Unterehrendingen	Aargau	Merged with Oberehrendingen	Ehrendingen	2006
Unterems	Valais	Merged with Turtmann	Turtmann-Unterems	2013
Unterendingen	Aargau	Incorporated into Endingen	Endingen	2014
Unterleibstadt	Aargau	Merged with Oberleibstadt	Leibstadt	1866
Unterschlatt	Thurgau	Merged with Mett-Oberschlatt	Schlatt	1999
Unterstammheim	Zürich	Merged with Oberstammheim and Waltalingen	Stammheim	2019
Untersteckholz	Bern	Incorporated into Langenthal	Langenthal	2010
Unterstrass	Zürich	Incorporated into Zürich	Zürich	1893
Uors	Grisons	Merged with Peiden	Uors-Peiden	1963
Uors-Peiden	Grisons	Merged with Camuns, Surcasti and Tersnaus	Suraua	2002
Vaglio	Ticino	Merged with Cagiallo, Lopagno, Roveredo, Sala Capriasca and Tesserete	Capriasca	2001
Vairano	Ticino	Merged with Casenzano	San Nazzaro	1930
Valangin	Neuchâtel	Incorporated into Neuchâtel	Neuchâtel	2021
Valchava	Grisons	Merged with Fuldera, Lü, Müstair, Santa Maria Val Müstair and Tschierv	Val Müstair	2009
Valcolla	Ticino	Incorporated into Lugano	Lugano	2013
Valendas	Grisons	Merged with Safien, Tenna and Versam	Safiental	2013
Vallamand	Vaud	Merged with Bellerive, Chabrey, Constantine, Montmagny, Mur and Villars-le-Grand	Vully-les-Lacs	2011
Valle Morobbia in Piano	Ticino	Incorporated into Giubiasco	Giubiasco	1867
Valpaschun	Grisons	Incorporated into Valchava	Valchava	1879
Valzeina	Grisons	Incorporated into Grüsch	Grüsch	2011
Vauderens	Fribourg	Incorporated into Ursy	Ursy	2001
Vauffelin	Bern	Merged with Plagne	Sauge	2014
Vaugondry	Vaud	Merged with Fontanezier, Romairon and Villars-Burquin	Tévenon	2011
Vaumarcus	Neuchâtel	Merged with Bevaix, Fresens, Gorgier, Montalchez and Saint-Aubin-Sauges	La Grande Béroche	2018
Vella	Grisons	Merged with Cumbel, Degen, Lumbrein, Morissen, Suraua, Vignogn and Vrin	Lumnezia	2013
Vellerat	Jura	Incorporated into Courrendlin	Courrendlin	2019
Veltheim	Zürich	Incorporated into Winterthur	Winterthur	1922
Venthône	Valais	Merged with Miège and Veyras	Noble-Contrée	2021
Verdabbio	Grisons	Incorporated into Grono	Grono	2017
Vergeletto	Ticino	Incorporated into Onsernone	Onsernone	2016
Vermes	Jura	Merged with Montsevelier and Vicques	Val Terbi	2013
Vernamiège	Valais	Merged with Mase and Nax	Mont-Noble	2011
Vernay	Fribourg	Merged with Bussy, Estavayer-le-Lac, Morens, Murist, Rueyres-les-Prés and Vuissens	Estavayer	2017
Vernéaz	Neuchâtel	Incorporated into Vaumarcus	Vaumarcus (known as Vaumarcus-Vernéaz until 1966)	1875
Versam	Grisons	Merged with Safien, Tenna and Valendas	Safiental	2013
Verscio	Ticino	Merged with Cavigliano and Tegna	Terre di Pedemonte	2013
Vesin	Fribourg	Incorporated into Cugy	Cugy	2005
Veyras	Valais	Merged with Miège and Venthône	Noble-Contrée	2021
Vezio	Ticino	Merged with Arosio, Breno, Fescoggia and Mugena	Alto Malcantone	2005
Vicosoprano	Grisons	Merged with Bondo, Castasegna, Soglio and Stampa	Bregaglia	2010
Vicques	Jura	Merged with Montsevelier and Vermes	Val Terbi	2013
Viganello	Ticino	Incorporated into Lugano	Lugano	2004
Vignogn	Grisons	Merged with Cumbel, Degen, Lumbrein, Morissen, Suraua, Vella and Vrin	Lumnezia	2013
Vilars	Neuchâtel	Merged with Fenin and Saules	Fenin-Vilars-Saules	1875
Villa Luganese	Ticino	Incorporated into Lugano	Lugano	2008
Villangeaux	Fribourg	Incorporated into Ecublens	Ecublens	1969
Villaraboud	Fribourg	Incorporated into Siviriez	Siviriez	2004
Villaranon	Fribourg	Incorporated into Siviriez	Siviriez	1978
Villarbeney	Fribourg	Incorporated into Botterens	Botterens	2006
Villarepos	Fribourg	Incorporated into Courtepin	Courtepin	2017
Villargiroud	Fribourg	Merged with Chavannes-sous-Orsonnens, Orsonnens and Villarsiviriaux	Villorsonnens	2001
Villariaz	Fribourg	Incorporated into Vuisternens-devant-Romont	Vuisternens-devant-Romont	2003
Villarimboud	Fribourg	Merged with Lussy	La Folliaz	2005
Villarlod	Fribourg	Merged with Estavayer-le-Gibloux, Rueyres-Saint-Laurent and Villarsel-le-Gibloux	Le Glèbe	2003
Villars-Bramard	Vaud	Merged with Cerniaz, Combremont-le-Grand, Combremont-le-Petit, Granges-près-Marnand, Marnand, Sassel and Seigneux	Valbroye	2011
Villars-Burquin	Vaud	Merged with Fontanezier, Romairon and Vaugondry	Tévenon	2011
Villars-d'Avry	Fribourg	Merged with Pont-en-Ogoz	Le Bry	1970
Villars-le-Grand	Vaud	Merged with Bellerive, Chabrey, Constantine, Montmagny, Mur and Vallamand	Vully-les-Lacs	2011
Villars-Lussery	Vaud	Merged with Lussery	Lussery-Villars	1999
Villars-Mendraz	Vaud	Merged with Montaubion-Chardonney, Peney-le-Jorat, Sottens and Villars-Tiercelin	Jorat-Menthue	2011
Villars-sous-Champvent	Vaud	Incorporated into Champvent	Champvent	2012
Villars-sous-Mont	Fribourg	Merged with Enney and Estavannens	Bas-Intyamon	2004
Villars-Tiercelin	Vaud	Merged with Montaubion-Chardonney, Peney-le-Jorat, Sottens and Villars-Mendraz	Jorat-Menthue	2011
Villarsel-le-Gibloux	Fribourg	Merged with Estavayer-le-Gibloux, Rueyres-Saint-Laurent and Villarlod	Le Glèbe	2003
Villarsiviriaux	Fribourg	Merged with Chavannes-sous-Orsonnens, Orsonnens and Villargiroud	Villorsonnens	2001
Villarvolard	Fribourg	Incorporated into Corbières	Corbières	2011
Villaz-Saint-Pierre	Fribourg	Merged with La Folliaz	Villaz	2020
Villeneuve	Fribourg	Incorporated into Surpierre	Surpierre	2017
Villette	Vaud	Merged with Cully, Epesses, Grandvaux and Riex	Bourg-en-Lavaux	2011
Villiers	Neuchâtel	Merged with Boudevilliers, Cernier, Chézard-Saint-Martin, Coffrane, Dombresson, Engollon, Fenin-Vilars-Saules, Fontainemelon, Fontaines, Le Pâquier, Les Geneveys-sur-Coffrane, Les Hauts-Geneveys, Montmollin and Savagnier	Val-de-Ruz	2013
Villnachern	Aargau	Incorporated into Brugg	Brugg	2026
Vingelz	Bern	Incorporated into Biel/Bienne	Biel/Bienne	1900
Vira	Ticino	Merged with Caviano, Contone, Gerra, Indemini, Magadino, Piazzogna, San Nazzaro and Sant'Abbondio	Gambarogno	2010
Vissoie	Valais	Merged with Ayer, Chandolin, Grimentz, Saint-Jean and Saint-Luc	Anniviers	2009
Voëns-Maley	Neuchâtel	Incorporated into Saint-Blaise	Saint-Blaise	1875
Vogorno	Ticino	Merged with Brione, Corippo, Cugnasco-Gerra (Gerra Valle), Frasco, Lavertezzo (Lavertezzo Valle) and Sonogno	Verzasca	2020
Vollèges	Valais	Merged with Bagnes	Val de Bagnes	2021
Vrin	Grisons	Merged with Cumbel, Degen, Lumbrein, Morissen, Suraua, Vella and Vignogn	Lumnezia	2013
Vuarmarens	Fribourg	Incorporated into Ursy	Ursy	2012
Vuibroye	Vaud	Merged with Bussigny-sur-Oron, Châtillens, Chesalles-sur-Oron, Écoteaux, Les Tavernes, Les Thioleyres, Oron-la-Ville, Oron-le-Châtel and Palézieux	Oron	2012
Vuippens	Fribourg	Incorporated into Marsens	Marsens	2001
Vuissens	Fribourg	Merged with Bussy, Estavayer-le-Lac, Morens, Murist, Rueyres-les-Prés and Vernay	Estavayer	2017
Vuisternens-en-Ogoz	Fribourg	Merged with Corpataux-Magnedens, Farvagny, Le Glèbe and Rossens	Gibloux	2016
Wahlern	Bern	Merged with Albligen	Schwarzenburg	2011
Waldhäusern	Aargau	Split in two	Bünzen; Waltenschwil	1940
Wallenbuch	Fribourg	Incorporated into Gurmels	Gurmels	2003
Wallenried	Fribourg	Incorporated into Courtepin	Courtepin	2017
Wallenwil	Thurgau	Incorporated into Eschlikon	Eschlikon	1997
Waltalingen	Zürich	Merged with Oberstammheim and Unterstammheim	Stammheim	2019
Waltensburg/Vuorz	Grisons	Incorporated into Breil/Brigels	Breil/Brigels	2018
Wangenried	Bern	Incorporated into Wangen an der Aare	Wangen an der Aare	2024
Wanzwil	Bern	Incorporated into Heimenhausen	Heimenhausen	2009
Wavre	Neuchâtel	Merged with Thielle	Thielle-Wavre	1888
Warth	Thurgau	Merged with Weiningen	Warth-Weiningen	1995
Weerswilen	Thurgau	Incorporated into Weinfelden	Weinfelden	1995
Weingarten	Thurgau	Incorporated into Lommis	Lommis	1995
Weiningen	Thurgau	Merged with Warth	Warth-Weiningen	1995
Wellhausen	Thurgau	Merged with Felben	Felben-Wellhausen	1983
Welschenrohr	Solothurn	Merged with Gänsbrunnen	Welschenrohr-Gänsbrunnen	2021
Werd	Aargau	Incorporated into Rottenschwil	Rottenschwil	1899
Wergenstein	Grisons	Merged with Casti	Casti-Wergenstein	1923
Wetzikon	Thurgau	Incorporated into Thundorf	Thundorf	1995
Wiedikon	Zürich	Incorporated into Zürich	Zürich	1893
Wiesen	Grisons	Incorporated into Davos	Davos	2009
Wiezikon	Thurgau	Incorporated into Sirnach	Sirnach	1997
Wil	Aargau	Merged with Etzgen, Hottwil, Mettau and Oberhofen	Mettauertal	2010
Wil bei Koppigen	Bern	Incorporated into Alchenstorf	Alchenstorf	1888
Wildhaus	St. Gallen	Merged with Alt St. Johann	Wildhaus-Alt St. Johann	2010
Wilen bei Neunforn	Thurgau	Incorporated into Neunforn	Neunforn	1996
Wilihof	Lucerne	Incorporated into Triengen	Triengen	2005
Willisau Land	Lucerne	Merged with Willisau Stadt	Willisau	2006
Willisau Stadt	Lucerne	Merged with Willisau Land	Willisau	2006
Willisdorf	Thurgau	Incorporated into Diessenhofen	Diessenhofen	2000
Windlach	Zürich	Incorporated into Stadel	Stadel	1907
Winikon	Lucerne	Incorporated into Triengen	Triengen	2009
Winistorf	Solothurn	Merged with Heinrichswil	Heinrichswil-Winistorf	1993
Wipkingen	Zürich	Incorporated into Zürich	Zürich	1893
Wislikofen	Aargau	Merged with Bad Zurzach, Baldingen, Böbikon, Kaiserstuhl, Rekingen, Rietheim and Rümikon	Zurzach	2022
Witikon	Zürich	Incorporated into Zürich	Zürich	1934
Wittenwil	Thurgau	Incorporated into Aadorf	Aadorf	1996
Wittwil	Aargau	Incorporated into Staffelbach	Staffelbach	1901
Wolfisberg	Bern	Incorporated into Niederbipp	Niederbipp	2020
Wolhusen Markt	Lucerne	Incorporated into Werthenstein	Werthenstein	1853
Wollishofen	Zürich	Incorporated into Zürich	Zürich	1893
Wülflingen	Zürich	Incorporated into Winterthur	Winterthur	1922
Zauggenried	Bern	Incorporated into Fraubrunnen	Fraubrunnen	2014
Zénauva	Fribourg	Merged with Bonnefontaine, Essert, Montévraz, Oberried and Praroman	Le Mouret	2003
Zezikon	Thurgau	Incorporated into Affeltrangen	Affeltrangen	1995
Zihlschlacht	Thurgau	Merged with Sitterdorf	Zihlschlacht-Sitterdorf	1997
Zillis	Grisons	Merged with Reischen	Zillis-Reischen	1875
Zimmerwald	Bern	Merged with Englisberg	Wald	2004
Zuben	Thurgau	Incorporated into Langrickenbach	Langrickenbach	1998
Zumholz	Fribourg	Incorporated into Plaffeien	Plaffeien	2017
Zwieselberg	Bern	Incorporated into Reutigen	Reutigen	2024
