= Brienz (disambiguation) =

Brienz is a village and municipality in the Bernese Oberland region of Switzerland.

It may also refer to:

- Lake Brienz, named after Brienz
- Brienz/Brinzauls, a former municipality in Graubünden, now part of Albula/Alvra
- Brienz-Surava, a former village in Graubünden
