= Innerbirrmoos =

Former municipality in Bern, Switzerland

- Former municipality
- Location of Innerbirrmoos
- Location within Switzerland Location within Canton of Bern
- Coordinates: 46.845°N 7.6907°E
- Country: Switzerland
- Canton: Bern
- District: Konolfingen
- Municipality: Linden

Population (1941)
  - Total: 558
- Time zone: UTC+01:00 (CET)
  - Summer (DST): UTC+02:00 (CEST)
- ISO 3166 code: CH-BE
- Website

Innerbirrmoos is a former municipality in the Konolfingen District of the canton of Bern, Switzerland. Since 1945 it has been part of the municipality of Linden.

== History ==
Innerbirrmoos is first mentioned in 1298 as Birmos. It had 292 inhabitants in 1764, 600 in 1850, 578 in 1900 and 558 in 1941. As part of the inner or eastern Kurzenberg, it belonged from 1399 or later to the Bernese office (Amt) of Röthenbach. From 1529 it was subject to the bailiwick (Landvogtei) of Signau for low justice and to the district court (Landgericht) of Konolfingen for high justice; its inhabitants belonged to the parish of Oberdiessbach.

Innerbirrmoos, also called the "inner municipality on the Kurzenberg" (Innere Gemeinde am Kurzenberg), shared pastures with Ausserbirrmoos to the west, which belonged to the lordship of Diessbach, until the forest and the common land (Allmend) were divided between the two communities (Gütergemeinden) in 1633. In 1778–1788 Bern ended the endless dispute between the farmers and the Tauner (smallholders) over shares in the use of the common land by dividing it among the farms. In 1798 Innerbirrmoos was assigned to the district of Steffisburg, and in 1803 to the Oberamt, later the district, of Konolfingen. In 1834 Innerbirrmoos constituted itself as a municipality of residents (Einwohnergemeinde). It is the only part of the municipality of Linden with a citizens' corporation for usage rights (burgerliche Nutzungskorporation).

== Bibliography ==
- F. Häusler, Das Emmental im Staate Bern, 2, 1968, 304–307
