= Brione-Gerra =

Coordinates: 46.296466°N 8.790729°E

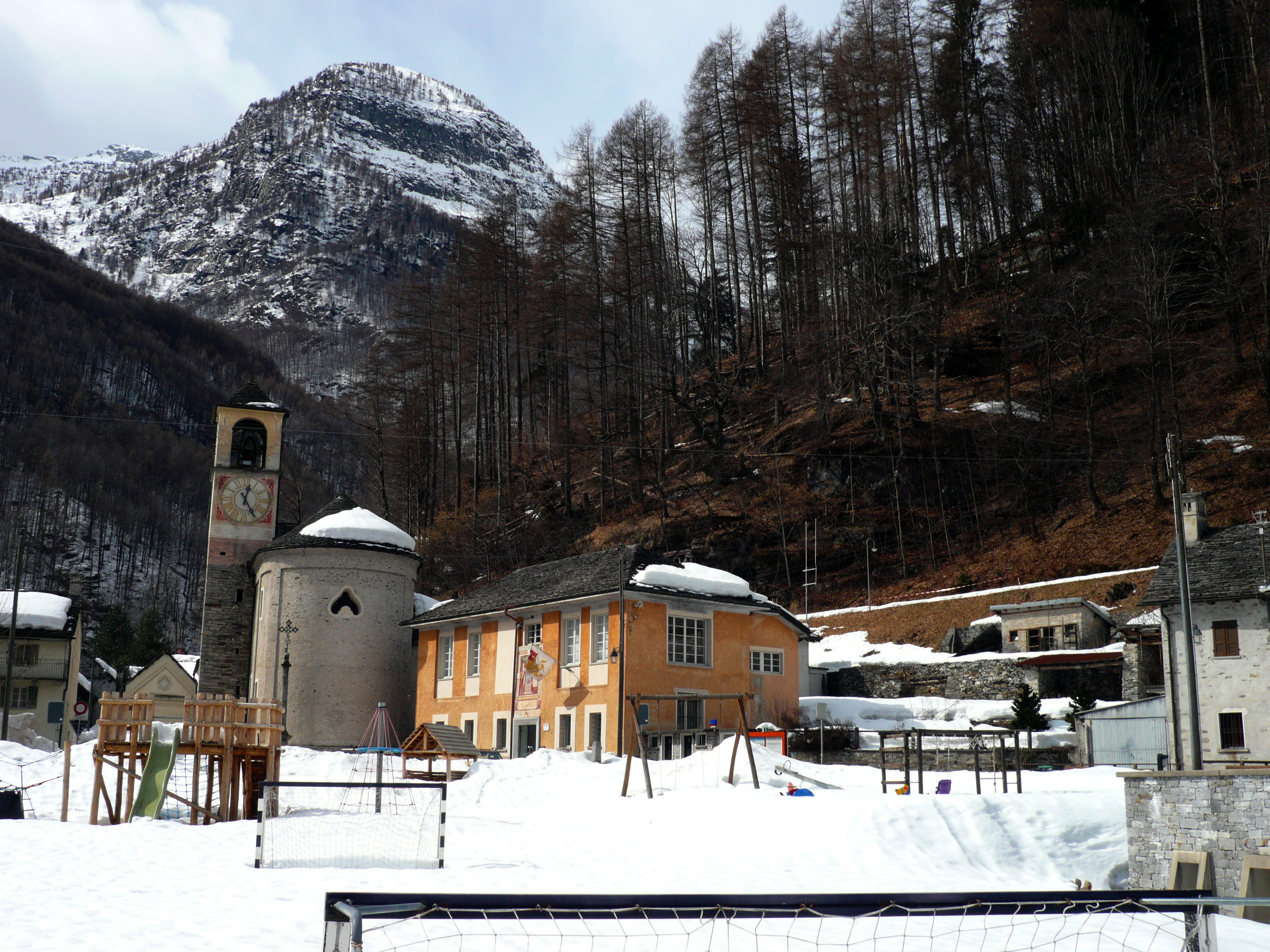
Centre of Brione, Ticino, Switzerland

Brione-Gerra is a former municipality in the district of Locarno in the canton of Ticino, Switzerland.

It ceased to exist in 1852, when it was split into the two new municipalities Brione and Gerra.
