= Holzmannshaus =

Coordinates: 47°28′23″N 8°58′4″E

Holzmannshaus is a former municipality in the district of Münchwilen in the canton of Thurgau, Switzerland.

It ceased to exist in 1871, when it was split into the two new municipalities Sirnach and Oberhofen bei Münchwilen.
