= Waldhäusern =

Municipality in Aargau, Switzerland

Coordinates: 47.327°N 8.315°E

Waldhäusern is a former municipality in the district of Muri in the canton of Aargau, Switzerland.

It ceased to exist in 1940, when it was split and incorporated as part of the municipalities Bünzen and (to a lesser extent) Waltenschwil.
