= Brienz-Surava =

Municipality in the Grisons, Switzerland

Coordinates: 46°40′7″N 9°35′47″E

Brienz-Surava is a former municipality in the district of Albula in the canton of Grisons, Switzerland.

It existed between 1869 and 1883 as a merger between Brienz/Brinzauls and Surava.
