= Mur, Switzerland =

Mur
- Former municipality
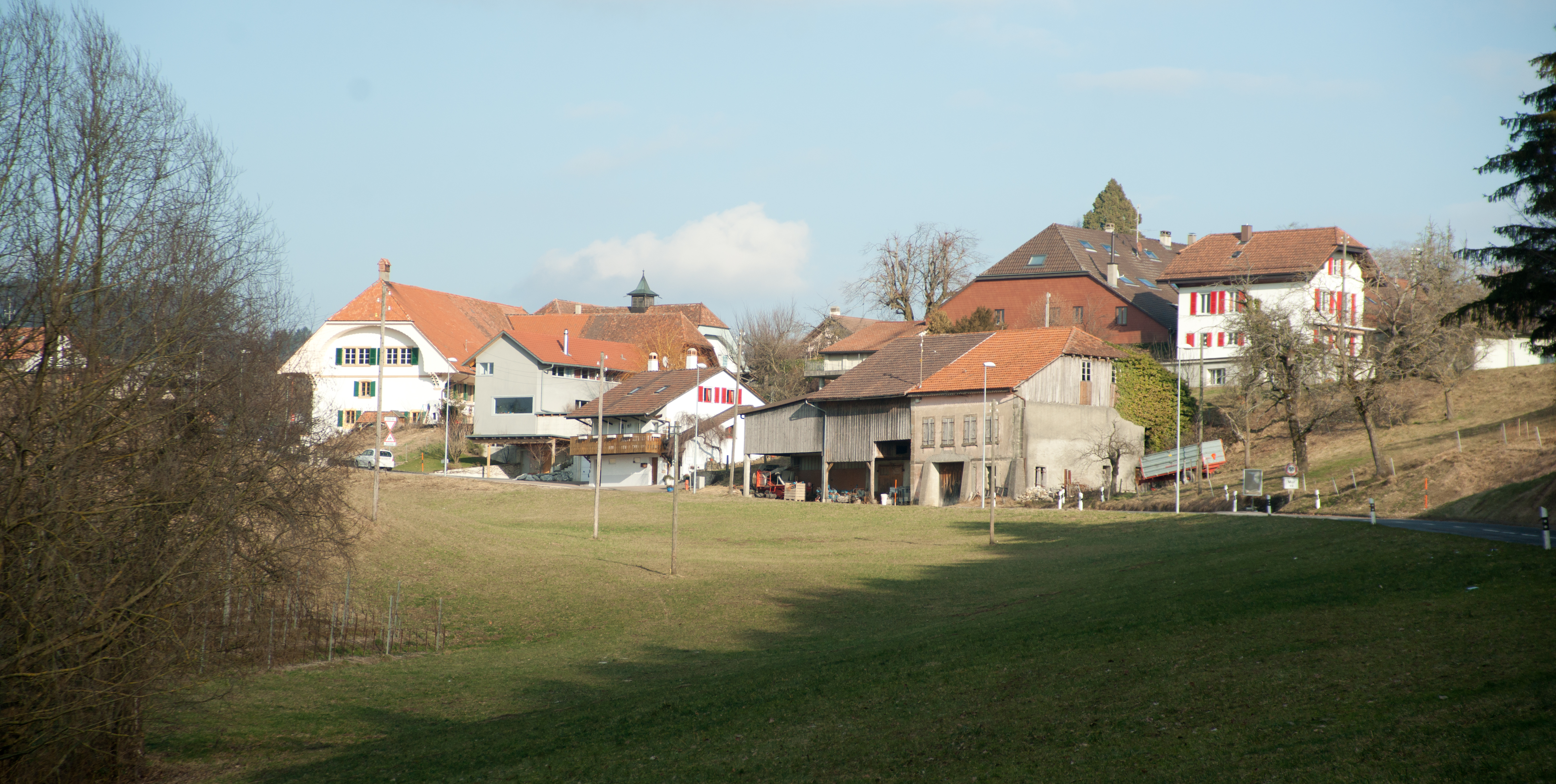
- Mur village

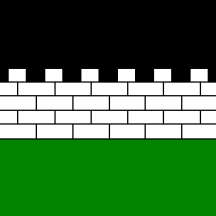
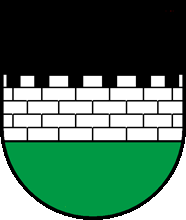
- Flag Coat of arms
- Location of Mur
- Location within Switzerland Location within Canton of Vaud
- Coordinates: 46°57′N 7°4′E
- Country: Switzerland
- Canton: Vaud
- District: Broye-Vully

Government
  - Mayor: Jean-Claude Tosalli

Area
  - Total: 1.78 km^{2} (0.69 sq mi)
- Elevation: 484 m (1,588 ft)

Population (2009)
  - Total: 211
  - Density: 119/km^{2} (307/sq mi)
- Time zone: UTC+01:00 (CET)
  - Summer (DST): UTC+02:00 (CEST)
- Postal code: 1787
- SFOS number: 5460
- ISO 3166 code: CH-VD
- Surrounded by: Cudrefin, Faoug, Greng (FR), Haut-Vully (FR), Vallamand
- Website: www.vully-les-lacs.ch

Mur is a former municipality in the district of Broye-Vully in the canton of Vaud in Switzerland.

The municipalities of Bellerive, Chabrey, Constantine, Montmagny, Mur, Vallamand and Villars-le-Grand merged on 1 July 2011 into the new municipality of Vully-les-Lacs.

== History ==
Mur is first mentioned in 1396 as Murs.

== Geography ==
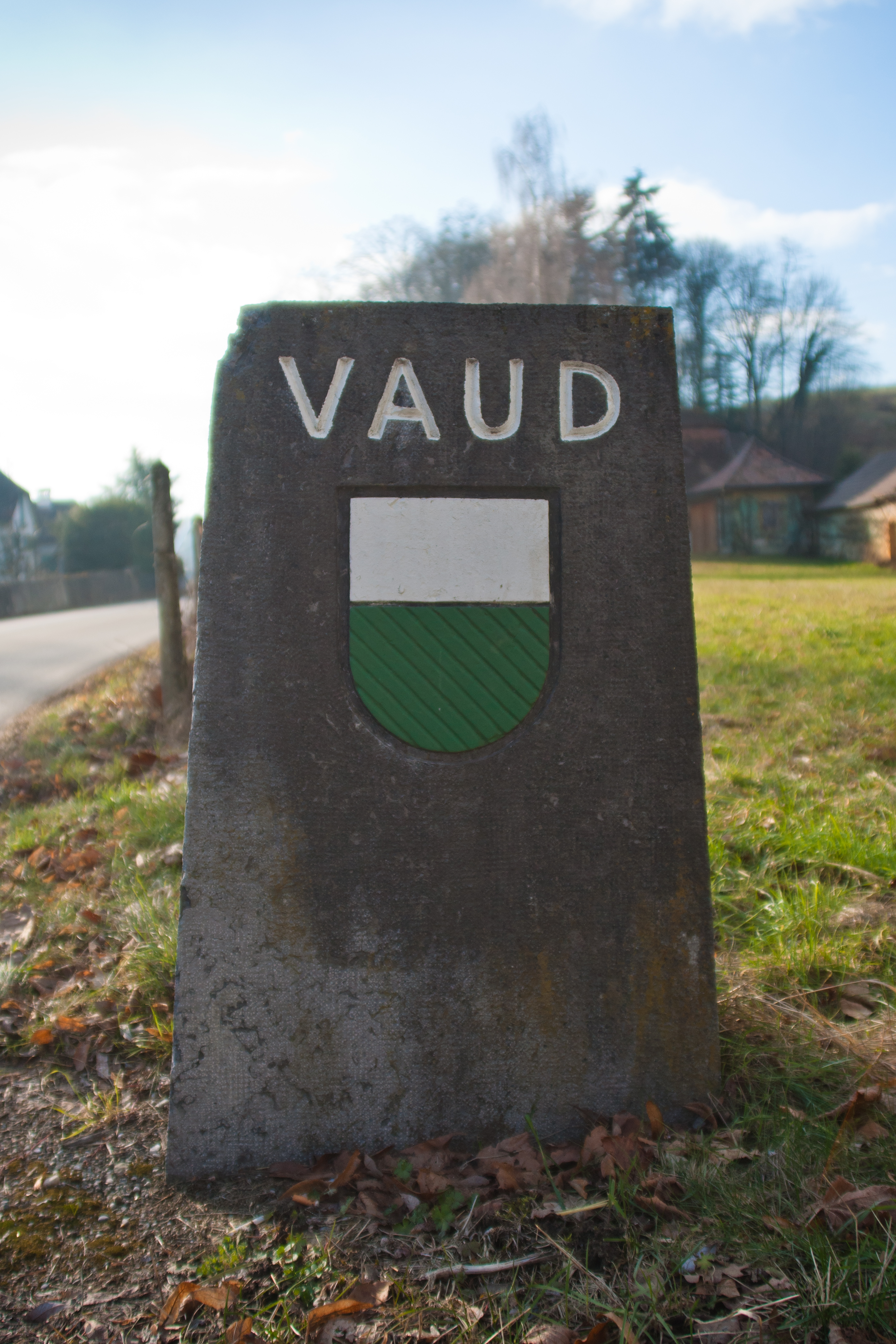
Border marker between the Cantons of Vaud and Fribourg in the village of Mur

Mur has an area, as of 2009, of 1.78 square kilometers (0.69 sq mi). Of this area, 1.33 km^{2} (0.51 sq mi) or 74.7% is used for agricultural purposes, while 0.16 km^{2} (0.062 sq mi) or 9.0% is forested. Of the rest of the land, 0.26 km^{2} (0.10 sq mi) or 14.6% is settled (buildings or roads) and 0.02 km^{2} (4.9 acres) or 1.1% is unproductive land.

Of the built up area, housing and buildings made up 7.3% and transportation infrastructure made up 5.1%. Power and water infrastructure as well as other special developed areas made up 2.2% of the area Out of the forested land, 7.9% of the total land area is heavily forested and 1.1% is covered with orchards or small clusters of trees. Of the agricultural land, 55.6% is used for growing crops and 11.2% is pastures, while 7.9% is used for orchards or vine crops.

The municipality was part of the Avenches District until it was dissolved on 31 August 2006, and Mur became part of the new district of Broye-Vully.

The village is divided by the Fribourg-Vaud border with the easternmost part of the village belonging to the Fribourg municipality of Haut-Vully.

== Coat of arms ==
The blazon of the municipal coat of arms is Per fess Sable and Vert, overall a Wall embattled Argent masoned Sable. This is an example of canting as the word for wall in French is le mur.

== Demographics ==
Mur has a population (as of 2009) of 211. As of 2008, 3.0% of the population are resident foreign nationals. Over the last 10 years (1999–2009 ) the population has changed at a rate of 24.1%. It has changed at a rate of 24.7% due to migration and at a rate of -1.2% due to births and deaths.

Most of the population (as of 2000) speaks French (124 or 71.7%), with German being second most common (43 or 24.9%) and Portuguese being third (3 or 1.7%).

Of the population in the municipality 65 or about 37.6% were born in Mur and lived there in 2000. There were 31 or 17.9% who were born in the same canton, while 64 or 37.0% were born somewhere else in Switzerland, and 12 or 6.9% were born outside of Switzerland.

In 2008 there were 4 live births to Swiss citizens and were 2 deaths of Swiss citizens. Ignoring immigration and emigration, the population of Swiss citizens increased by 2 while the foreign population remained the same. There were 2 Swiss men and 2 Swiss women who immigrated back to Switzerland. At the same time, there were 1 non-Swiss woman who immigrated from another country to Switzerland. The total Swiss population change in 2008 (from all sources, including moves across municipal borders) was an increase of 8 and the non-Swiss population decreased by 2 people. This represents a population growth rate of 3.1%.

The age distribution, as of 2009, in Mur is; 21 children or 10.0% of the population are between 0 and 9 years old and 26 teenagers or 12.3% are between 10 and 19. Of the adult population, 17 people or 8.1% of the population are between 20 and 29 years old. 15 people or 7.1% are between 30 and 39, 41 people or 19.4% are between 40 and 49, and 43 people or 20.4% are between 50 and 59. The senior population distribution is 28 people or 13.3% of the population are between 60 and 69 years old, 13 people or 6.2% are between 70 and 79, there are 6 people or 2.8% who are between 80 and 89, and there is 1 person who is 90 and older.

As of 2000, there were 74 people who were single and never married in the municipality. There were 76 married individuals, 13 widows or widowers and 10 individuals who are divorced.

As of 2000 the average number of residents per living room was 0.53 which is fewer people per room than the cantonal average of 0.61 per room. In this case, a room is defined as space of a housing unit of at least 4 m^{2} (43 sq ft) as normal bedrooms, dining rooms, living rooms, kitchens and habitable cellars and attics. About 68.8% of the total households were owner occupied, or in other words did not pay rent (though they may have a mortgage or a rent-to-own agreement).

As of 2000, there were 67 private households in the municipality, and an average of 2.5 persons per household. There were 20 households that consist of only one person and 8 households with five or more people. Out of a total of 68 households that answered this question, 29.4% were households made up of just one person and there was 1 adult who lived with their parents. Of the rest of the households, there are 17 married couples without children, 23 married couples with children There were 6 single parents with a child or children.

In 2000 there were 46 single family homes (or 67.6% of the total) out of a total of 68 inhabited buildings. There were 7 multi-family buildings (10.3%), along with 12 multi-purpose buildings that were mostly used for housing (17.6%) and 3 other use buildings (commercial or industrial) that also had some housing (4.4%). Of the single family homes 12 were built before 1919, while 6 were built between 1990 and 2000. The most multi-family homes (4) were built before 1919 and the next most (1) were built between 1919 and 1945.

In 2000 there were 80 apartments in the municipality. The most common apartment size was 5 rooms of which there were 20. There were 1 single room apartments and 42 apartments with five or more rooms. Of these apartments, a total of 64 apartments (80.0% of the total) were permanently occupied, while 10 apartments (12.5%) were seasonally occupied and 6 apartments (7.5%) were empty. As of 2009, the construction rate of new housing units was 0 new units per 1000 residents. The vacancy rate for the municipality, in 2010, was 0%.

The historical population is given in the following chart:

== Heritage sites of national significance ==
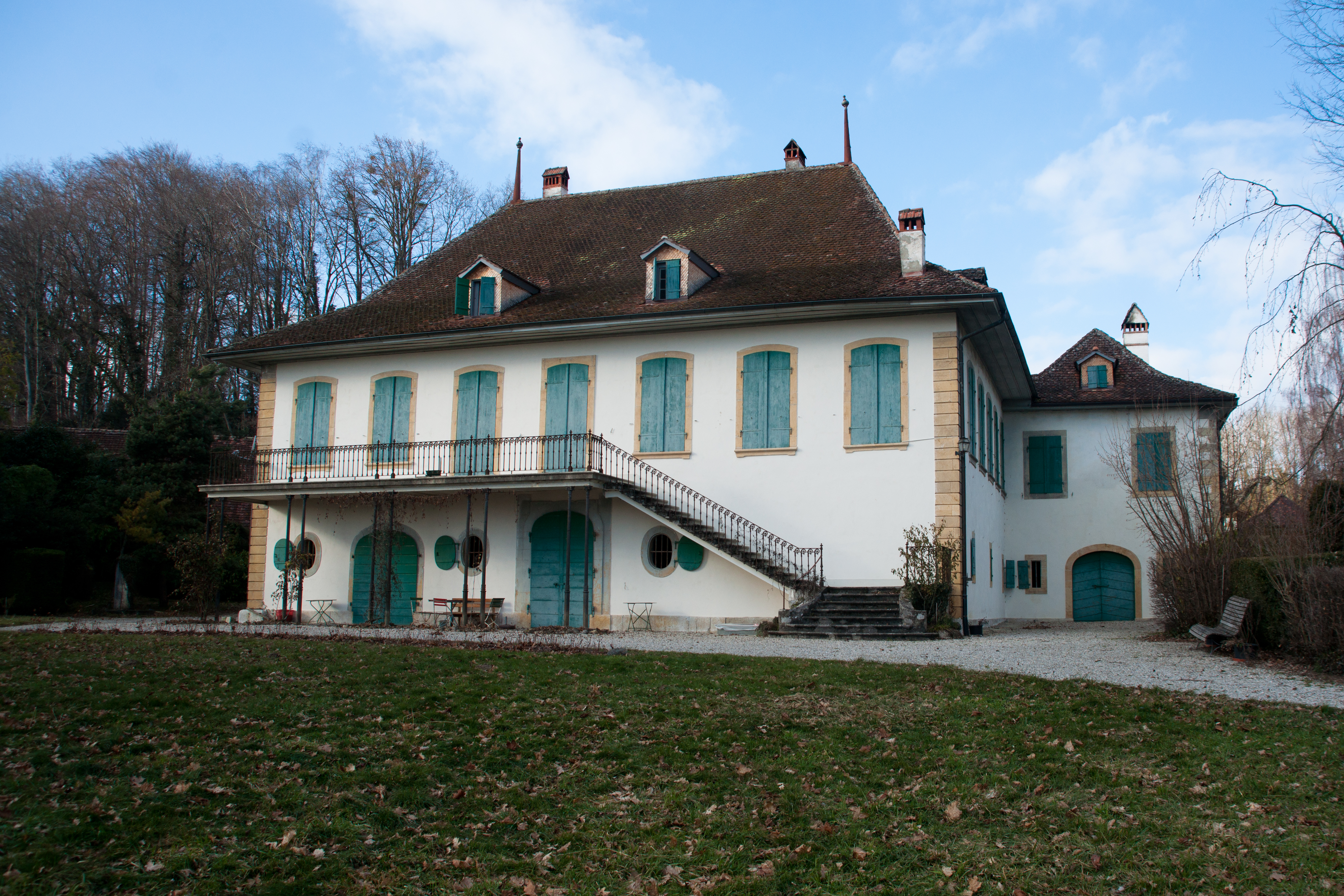
Guévaux Castle

Guévaux Castle is listed as a Swiss heritage site of national significance. The prehistoric settlement at Chenevières de Guévaux I is part of the Prehistoric Pile dwellings around the Alps a UNESCO World Heritage Site.

== Politics ==
In the 2007 federal election the most popular party was the FDP which received 28.05% of the vote. The next three most popular parties were the SVP (20.17%), the SP (18.82%) and the Green Party (10.44%). In the federal election, a total of 81 votes were cast, and the voter turnout was 54.0%.

== Economy ==
As of 2010, Mur had an unemployment rate of 2%. As of 2008, there were 32 people employed in the primary economic sector and about 9 businesses involved in this sector. 6 people were employed in the secondary sector and there were 3 businesses in this sector. 17 people were employed in the tertiary sector, with 9 businesses in this sector. There were 88 residents of the municipality who were employed in some capacity, of which females made up 45.5% of the workforce.

In 2008 the total number of full-time equivalent jobs was 39. The number of jobs in the primary sector was 23, of which 21 were in agriculture and 2 were in fishing or fisheries. The number of jobs in the secondary sector was 5, all of which were in construction. The number of jobs in the tertiary sector was 11. In the tertiary sector; 3 or 27.3% were in the sale or repair of motor vehicles, 2 or 18.2% were in the information industry, 4 or 36.4% were technical professionals or scientists, 1 was in education.

In 2000, there were 6 workers who commuted into the municipality and 51 workers who commuted away. The municipality is a net exporter of workers, with about 8.5 workers leaving the municipality for every one entering. Of the working population, 6.8% used public transportation to get to work, and 58% used a private car.

== Religion ==
From the 2000 census, 21 or 12.1% were Roman Catholic, while 131 or 75.7% belonged to the Swiss Reformed Church. Of the rest of the population, there was 1 member of an Orthodox church who belonged, and there were 5 individuals (or about 2.89% of the population) who belonged to another Christian church. 14 (or about 8.09% of the population) belonged to no church, are agnostic or atheist, and 1 individuals (or about 0.58% of the population) did not answer the question.

== Education ==
In Mur about 47 or (27.2%) of the population have completed non-mandatory upper secondary education, and 36 or (20.8%) have completed additional higher education (either University or a Fachhochschule). Of the 36 who completed tertiary schooling, 61.1% were Swiss men, 36.1% were Swiss women.

In the 2009/2010 school year there were a total of 26 students in the Mur (VD) school district. In the Vaud cantonal school system, two years of non-obligatory pre-school are provided by the political districts. During the school year, the political district provided pre-school care for a total of 155 children of which 83 children (53.5%) received subsidized pre-school care. The canton's primary school program requires students to attend for four years. There were 12 students in the municipal primary school program. The obligatory lower secondary school program lasts for six years and there were 13 students in those schools. There were also 1 students who were home schooled or attended another non-traditional school.

As of 2000, there were 5 students in Mur who came from another municipality, while 37 residents attended schools outside the municipality.
