= Vallamand =

- Former municipality
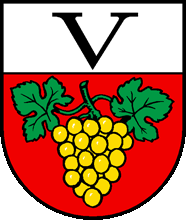
- Coat of arms
- Location of Vallamand
- Location within Switzerland Location within Canton of Vaud
- Coordinates: 46°56′N 7°02′E
- Country: Switzerland
- Canton: Vaud
- District: Broye-Vully

Government
  - Mayor: Vincent Martial

Area
  - Total: 2.34 km^{2} (0.90 sq mi)
- Elevation: 513 m (1,683 ft)

Population (2009)
  - Total: 393
  - Density: 168/km^{2} (435/sq mi)
- Demonym: Les Vallamandais
- Time zone: UTC+01:00 (CET)
  - Summer (DST): UTC+02:00 (CEST)
- Postal code: 1586
- SFOS number: 5462
- ISO 3166 code: CH-VD
- Surrounded by: Avenches, Bellerive, Constantine, Cudrefin, Faoug, Mur
- Website: www.vully-les-lacs.ch

Vallamand (French pronunciation: [valamɑ̃]) was a municipality in the Swiss canton of Vaud in the district of Broye-Vully.

The municipalities of Bellerive, Chabrey, Constantine, Montmagny, Mur, Vallamand and Villars-le-Grand merged on 1 July 2011 into the new municipality of Vully-les-Lacs.

== History ==
Vallamand is first mentioned in 1246 as Ualamant.

== Geography ==
Vallamand has an area, as of 2009, of 2.34 square kilometers (0.90 sq mi). Of this area, 1.34 km^{2} (0.52 sq mi) or 57.3% is used for agricultural purposes, while 0.52 km^{2} (0.20 sq mi) or 22.2% is forested. Of the rest of the land, 0.46 km^{2} (0.18 sq mi) or 19.7% is settled (buildings or roads) and 0.03 km^{2} (7.4 acres) or 1.3% is unproductive land.

Of the built up area, housing and buildings made up 11.1% and transportation infrastructure made up 6.8%. Out of the forested land, all of the forested land area is covered with heavy forests. Of the agricultural land, 44.0% is used for growing crops and 6.8% is pastures, while 6.4% is used for orchards or vine crops.

The municipality was part of the Avenches District until it was dissolved on 31 August 2006, and Vallamand became part of the new district of Broye-Vully.

== Coat of arms ==
The blazon of the municipal coat of arms is Gules, a Grape Bunch Or leafed Vert, in Chief Argent a letter V Sable.

== Demographics ==
Vallamand has a population (as of 2009) of 393. As of 2008, 12.7% of the population are resident foreign nationals. Over the last 10 years (1999–2009 ) the population has changed at a rate of 23.2%. It has changed at a rate of 23.2% due to migration and at a rate of 0.3% due to births and deaths.

Most of the population (as of 2000) speaks French (196 or 57.8%), with German being second most common (130 or 38.3%) and English being third (7 or 2.1%). There is 1 person who speaks Italian.

Of the population in the municipality 98 or about 28.9% were born in Vallamand and lived there in 2000. There were 42 or 12.4% who were born in the same canton, while 159 or 46.9% were born somewhere else in Switzerland, and 30 or 8.8% were born outside of Switzerland.

In 2008 there were 6 live births to Swiss citizens and 1 birth to non-Swiss citizens, and in same time span there were 3 deaths of Swiss citizens. Ignoring immigration and emigration, the population of Swiss citizens increased by 3 while the foreign population increased by 1. There were 2 Swiss women who immigrated back to Switzerland. At the same time, there were 7 non-Swiss men and 5 non-Swiss women who immigrated from another country to Switzerland. The total Swiss population remained the same in 2008 and the non-Swiss population increased by 13 people. This represents a population growth rate of 3.4%.

The age distribution, as of 2009, in Vallamand is; 41 children or 10.5% of the population are between 0 and 9 years old and 39 teenagers or 9.9% are between 10 and 19. Of the adult population, 43 people or 11.0% of the population are between 20 and 29 years old. 52 people or 13.3% are between 30 and 39, 69 people or 17.6% are between 40 and 49, and 56 people or 14.3% are between 50 and 59. The senior population distribution is 46 people or 11.7% of the population are between 60 and 69 years old, 25 people or 6.4% are between 70 and 79, there are 20 people or 5.1% who are between 80 and 89, and there is 1 person who is 90 and older.

As of 2000, there were 119 people who were single and never married in the municipality. There were 178 married individuals, 16 widows or widowers and 26 individuals who are divorced.

As of 2000 the average number of residents per living room was 0.5 which is fewer people per room than the cantonal average of 0.61 per room. In this case, a room is defined as space of a housing unit of at least 4 m^{2} (43 sq ft) as normal bedrooms, dining rooms, living rooms, kitchens and habitable cellars and attics. About 71.4% of the total households were owner occupied, or in other words did not pay rent (though they may have a mortgage or a rent-to-own agreement).

As of 2000, there were 144 private households in the municipality, and an average of 2.2 persons per household. There were 46 households that consist of only one person and 8 households with five or more people. Out of a total of 150 households that answered this question, 30.7% were households made up of just one person and there was 1 adult who lived with their parents. Of the rest of the households, there are 57 married couples without children, 32 married couples with children There were 6 single parents with a child or children. There were 2 households that were made up of unrelated people and 6 households that were made up of some sort of institution or another collective housing.

In 2000 there were 127 single family homes (or 75.1% of the total) out of a total of 169 inhabited buildings. There were 19 multi-family buildings (11.2%), along with 14 multi-purpose buildings that were mostly used for housing (8.3%) and 9 other use buildings (commercial or industrial) that also had some housing (5.3%). Of the single family homes 26 were built before 1919, while 16 were built between 1990 and 2000. The greatest number of multi-family homes (4) were built before 1919 and again between 1961 and 1970

In 2000 there were 211 apartments in the municipality. The most common apartment size was 4 rooms of which there were 63. There were 2 single room apartments and 76 apartments with five or more rooms. Of these apartments, a total of 140 apartments (66.4% of the total) were permanently occupied, while 61 apartments (28.9%) were seasonally occupied and 10 apartments (4.7%) were empty. As of 2009, the construction rate of new housing units was 2.5 new units per 1000 residents. The vacancy rate for the municipality, in 2010, was 0.84%.

The historical population is given in the following chart:

== Politics ==
In the 2007 federal election the most popular party was the SVP which received 32.17% of the vote. The next three most popular parties were the FDP (27.07%), the LPS Party (15.88%) and the Green Party (8.64%). In the federal election, a total of 123 votes were cast, and the voter turnout was 43.3%.

== Economy ==
As of 2010, Vallamand had an unemployment rate of 2.8%. As of 2008, there were 26 people employed in the primary economic sector and about 9 businesses involved in this sector. 13 people were employed in the secondary sector and there were 4 businesses in this sector. 24 people were employed in the tertiary sector, with 10 businesses in this sector. There were 185 residents of the municipality who were employed in some capacity, of which females made up 38.4% of the workforce.

In 2008 the total number of full-time equivalent jobs was 46. The number of jobs in the primary sector was 17, all of which were in agriculture. The number of jobs in the secondary sector was 11 of which 3 or (27.3%) were in manufacturing and 8 (72.7%) were in construction. The number of jobs in the tertiary sector was 18. In the tertiary sector; 5 or 27.8% were in the sale or repair of motor vehicles, 4 or 22.2% were in the movement and storage of goods, 3 or 16.7% were in a hotel or restaurant, 2 or 11.1% were technical professionals or scientists, 1 was in education.

In 2000, there were 30 workers who commuted into the municipality and 128 workers who commuted away. The municipality is a net exporter of workers, with about 4.3 workers leaving the municipality for every one entering. Of the working population, 4.3% used public transportation to get to work, and 67% used a private car.

== Religion ==
From the 2000 census, 56 or 16.5% were Roman Catholic, while 219 or 64.6% belonged to the Swiss Reformed Church. Of the rest of the population, there was 1 member of an Orthodox church, there was 1 individual who belongs to the Christian Catholic Church, and there were 6 individuals (or about 1.77% of the population) who belonged to another Christian church. There was 1 individual who was Islamic and 1 person who was Buddhist. 40 (or about 11.80% of the population) belonged to no church, are agnostic or atheist, and 14 individuals (or about 4.13% of the population) did not answer the question.

== Education ==
In Vallamand about 130 or (38.3%) of the population have completed non-mandatory upper secondary education, and 76 or (22.4%) have completed additional higher education (either University or a Fachhochschule). Of the 76 who completed tertiary schooling, 63.2% were Swiss men, 27.6% were Swiss women, 6.6% were non-Swiss men.

In the 2009/2010 school year there were a total of 34 students in the Vallamand school district. In the Vaud cantonal school system, two years of non-obligatory pre-school are provided by the political districts. During the school year, the political district provided pre-school care for a total of 155 children of which 83 children (53.5%) received subsidized pre-school care. The canton's primary school program requires students to attend for four years. There were 18 students in the municipal primary school program. The obligatory lower secondary school program lasts for six years and there were 16 students in those schools.

As of 2000, there were 19 students in Vallamand who came from another municipality, while 43 residents attended schools outside the municipality.
