= Champmartin =

Village in Vaud, Switzerland

Coordinates: 46°56′29″N 6°59′53″E

Champmartin is a village in the district of Avenches in the canton of Vaud, Switzerland.

On January 1, 2002, the municipality Champmartin merged with Cudrefin under the name Cudrefin.
