= Montmagny, Switzerland =

Montmagny
- Former municipality
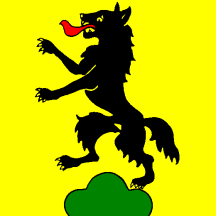
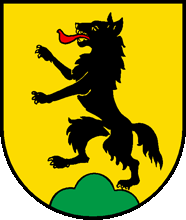
- Flag Coat of arms
- Location of Montmagny
- Location within Switzerland Location within Canton of Vaud
- Coordinates: 46°56′N 07°01′E
- Country: Switzerland
- Canton: Vaud
- District: Broye-Vully

Government
  - Mayor: Jacques Loup

Area
  - Total: 3.8 km^{2} (1.5 sq mi)
- Elevation: 565 m (1,854 ft)

Population (2009)
  - Total: 180
  - Density: 47/km^{2} (120/sq mi)
- Time zone: UTC+01:00 (CET)
  - Summer (DST): UTC+02:00 (CEST)
- Postal code: 1587
- SFOS number: 5459
- ISO 3166 code: CH-VD
- Surrounded by: Avenches, Bellerive, Chabrey, Constantine, Cudrefin, Villars-le-Grand
- Website: www.vully-les-lacs.ch

Montmagny (French pronunciation: [mɔ̃maɲi]) is a former municipality in the district of Broye-Vully in the canton of Vaud in Switzerland.

The municipalities of Bellerive, Chabrey, Constantine, Montmagny, Mur, Vallamand and Villars-le-Grand merged on 1 July 2011 into the new municipality of Vully-les-Lacs.

== History ==
Montmagny is first mentioned in the 13th Century as Manniaco. In 1458 it was mentioned as Montmagniel.

== Geography ==
Montmagny has an area, as of 2009, of 3.8 square kilometers (1.5 sq mi). Of this area, 2.77 km^{2} (1.07 sq mi) or 72.9% is used for agricultural purposes, while 0.81 km^{2} (0.31 sq mi) or 21.3% is forested. Of the rest of the land, 0.17 km^{2} (0.066 sq mi) or 4.5% is settled (buildings or roads), 0.07 km^{2} (17 acres) or 1.8% is either rivers or lakes.

Of the built up area, housing and buildings made up 3.2% and transportation infrastructure made up 1.3%. Out of the forested land, 19.2% of the total land area is heavily forested and 2.1% is covered with orchards or small clusters of trees. Of the agricultural land, 67.9% is used for growing crops and 2.9% is pastures, while 2.1% is used for orchards or vine crops. All the water in the municipality is flowing water.

The municipality was part of the Avenches District until it was dissolved on 31 August 2006, and Montmagny became part of the new district of Broye-Vully.

The municipality is located in the hill country of the Vully region.

== Coat of arms ==
The blazon of the municipal coat of arms is Or, on a Coupeaux Vert a Wolf rampant Sable langued Gules.

== Demographics ==
Montmagny has a population (as of 2009) of 180. As of 2008, 7.8% of the population are resident foreign nationals. Over the last 10 years (1999–2009 ) the population has changed at a rate of 8.4%. It has changed at a rate of 12.7% due to migration and at a rate of -1.8% due to births and deaths.

Most of the population (as of 2000) speaks French (126 or 80.8%), with German being second most common (20 or 12.8%) and Portuguese being third (4 or 2.6%). There are 3 people who speak Italian.

Of the population in the municipality 64 or about 41.0% were born in Montmagny and lived there in 2000. There were 13 or 8.3% who were born in the same canton, while 60 or 38.5% were born somewhere else in Switzerland, and 14 or 9.0% were born outside of Switzerland.

In 2008 there were 3 live births to Swiss citizens and 1 death of a Swiss citizen. Ignoring immigration and emigration, the population of Swiss citizens increased by 2 while the foreign population remained the same. There was 1 non-Swiss man who immigrated from another country to Switzerland. The total Swiss population change in 2008 (from all sources, including moves across municipal borders) was an increase of 10 and the non-Swiss population decreased by 5 people. This represents a population growth rate of 2.9%.

The age distribution, as of 2009, in Montmagny is; 22 children or 12.2% of the population are between 0 and 9 years old and 20 teenagers or 11.1% are between 10 and 19. Of the adult population, 20 people or 11.1% of the population are between 20 and 29 years old. 24 people or 13.3% are between 30 and 39, 34 people or 18.9% are between 40 and 49, and 18 people or 10.0% are between 50 and 59. The senior population distribution is 15 people or 8.3% of the population are between 60 and 69 years old, 17 people or 9.4% are between 70 and 79, there are 10 people or 5.6% who are between 80 and 89.

As of 2000, there were 68 people who were single and never married in the municipality. There were 74 married individuals, 7 widows or widowers and 7 individuals who are divorced.

As of 2000 the average number of residents per living room was 0.55 which is fewer people per room than the cantonal average of 0.61 per room. In this case, a room is defined as space of a housing unit of at least 4 m^{2} (43 sq ft) as normal bedrooms, dining rooms, living rooms, kitchens and habitable cellars and attics. About 54.4% of the total households were owner occupied, or in other words did not pay rent (though they may have a mortgage or a rent-to-own agreement).

As of 2000, there were 63 private households in the municipality, and an average of 2.4 persons per household. There were 23 households that consist of only one person and 6 households with five or more people. Out of a total of 64 households that answered this question, 35.9% were households made up of just one person. Of the rest of the households, there are 17 married couples without children, 16 married couples with children There were 7 single parents with a child or children.

In 2000 there were 34 single family homes (or 55.7% of the total) out of a total of 61 inhabited buildings. There were 7 multi-family buildings (11.5%), along with 18 multi-purpose buildings that were mostly used for housing (29.5%) and 2 other use buildings (commercial or industrial) that also had some housing (3.3%). Of the single family homes 11 were built before 1919, while 10 were built between 1990 and 2000. The most multi-family homes (4) were built between 1919 and 1945 and the next most (2) were built before 1919.

In 2000 there were 74 apartments in the municipality. The most common apartment size was 4 rooms of which there were 30. There were 2 single room apartments and 22 apartments with five or more rooms. Of these apartments, a total of 57 apartments (77.0% of the total) were permanently occupied, while 14 apartments (18.9%) were seasonally occupied and 3 apartments (4.1%) were empty. As of 2009, the construction rate of new housing units was 0 new units per 1000 residents. The vacancy rate for the municipality, in 2010, was 0%.

The historical population is given in the following chart:

== Politics ==
In the 2007 federal election the most popular party was the SVP which received 31.77% of the vote. The next three most popular parties were the FDP (25.09%), the LPS Party (20.94%) and the SP (12.45%). In the federal election, a total of 63 votes were cast, and the voter turnout was 50.4%.

== Economy ==
As of 2010, Montmagny had an unemployment rate of 4.8%. As of 2008, there were 27 people employed in the primary economic sector and about 9 businesses involved in this sector. people were employed in the secondary sector and there were businesses in this sector. 4 people were employed in the tertiary sector, with 2 businesses in this sector. There were 73 residents of the municipality who were employed in some capacity, of which females made up 35.6% of the workforce.

In 2008 the total number of full-time equivalent jobs was 21. The number of jobs in the primary sector was 18, all of which were in agriculture. There were no jobs in the secondary sector. The number of jobs in the tertiary sector was 3. In the tertiary sector; 2 were in the sale or repair of motor vehicles, 1 was a technical professional or scientist.

In 2000, there were 13 workers who commuted into the municipality and 44 workers who commuted away. The municipality is a net exporter of workers, with about 3.4 workers leaving the municipality for every one entering. Of the working population, 0% used public transportation to get to work, and 64.4% used a private car.

== Religion ==
From the 2000 census, 36 or 23.1% were Roman Catholic, while 97 or 62.2% belonged to the Swiss Reformed Church. Of the rest of the population, and there were 3 individuals (or about 1.92% of the population) who belonged to another Christian church. There were 3 (or about 1.92% of the population) who were Islamic. There were and 1 individual who belonged to another church. 12 (or about 7.69% of the population) belonged to no church, are agnostic or atheist, and 4 individuals (or about 2.56% of the population) did not answer the question.

== Education ==
In Montmagny about 45 or (28.8%) of the population have completed non-mandatory upper secondary education, and 20 or (12.8%) have completed additional higher education (either University or a Fachhochschule). Of the 20 who completed tertiary schooling, 75.0% were Swiss men, 20.0% were Swiss women.

In the 2009/2010 school year there were a total of 24 students in the Montmagny school district. In the Vaud cantonal school system, two years of non-obligatory pre-school are provided by the political districts. During the school year, the political district provided pre-school care for a total of 155 children of which 83 children (53.5%) received subsidized pre-school care. The canton's primary school program requires students to attend for four years. There were 13 students in the municipal primary school program. The obligatory lower secondary school program lasts for six years and there were 11 students in those schools.

As of 2000, there was one student in Montmagny who came from another municipality, while 28 residents attended schools outside the municipality.
