= Chabrey =

- Former municipality
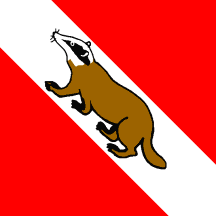
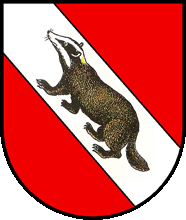
- Flag Coat of arms
- Location of Chabrey
- Location within Switzerland Location within Canton of Vaud
- Coordinates: 46°56′N 06°59′E
- Country: Switzerland
- Canton: Vaud
- District: Broye-Vully

Government
  - Mayor: Ernest Chuard

Area
  - Total: 3.96 km^{2} (1.53 sq mi)
- Elevation: 498 m (1,634 ft)

Population (2009)
  - Total: 267
  - Density: 67.4/km^{2} (175/sq mi)
- Time zone: UTC+01:00 (CET)
  - Summer (DST): UTC+02:00 (CEST)
- Postal code: 1589
- SFOS number: 5453
- ISO 3166 code: CH-VD
- Surrounded by: Cudrefin, Delley-Portalban (FR), Montmagny, Neuchâtel (NE), Villars-le-Grand
- Website: www.vully-les-lacs.ch

Chabrey (French pronunciation: [ʃabʁɛ]) is a former municipality in the district of Broye-Vully in the canton of Vaud in Switzerland.

The municipalities of Bellerive, Chabrey, Constantine, Montmagny, Mur, Vallamand and Villars-le-Grand merged on 1 July 2011 into the new municipality of Vully-les-Lacs.

== History ==
Chabrey is first mentioned in 1343 as Charbrey.

== Geography ==
Chabrey has an area, as of 2009, of 3.96 square kilometers (1.53 sq mi). Of this area, 1.73 km^{2} (0.67 sq mi) or 43.7% is used for agricultural purposes, while 1.44 km^{2} (0.56 sq mi) or 36.4% is forested. Of the rest of the land, 0.3 km^{2} (0.12 sq mi) or 7.6% is settled (buildings or roads), 0.02 km^{2} (4.9 acres) or 0.5% is either rivers or lakes and 0.45 km^{2} (0.17 sq mi) or 11.4% is unproductive land.

Of the built up area, housing and buildings made up 4.3% and transportation infrastructure made up 2.8%. Out of the forested land, all of the forested land area is covered with heavy forests. Of the agricultural land, 36.1% is used for growing crops and 4.5% is pastures, while 3.0% is used for orchards or vine crops. All the water in the municipality is in lakes.

The municipality was part of the Avenches District until it was dissolved on 31 August 2006, and Chabrey became part of the new district of Broye-Vully.

The municipality is located along the shore of Lake Neuchâtel.

== Coat of arms ==
The blazon of the municipal coat of arms is Gules, on a bend Argent an badger proper.

== Demographics ==
Chabrey has a population (as of 2009) of 267. As of 2008, 7.3% of the population are resident foreign nationals. Over the last 10 years (1999–2009 ) the population has changed at a rate of 32.2%. It has changed at a rate of 33.7% due to migration and at a rate of 0% due to births and deaths.

Most of the population (as of 2000) speaks French (171 or 86.4%), with German being second most common (23 or 11.6%) and Portuguese being third (2 or 1.0%).

Of the population in the municipality 76 or about 38.4% were born in Chabrey and lived there in 2000. There were 30 or 15.2% who were born in the same canton, while 70 or 35.4% were born somewhere else in Switzerland, and 19 or 9.6% were born outside of Switzerland.

In 2008 there was 1 live birth to Swiss citizens and were 2 deaths of Swiss citizens. Ignoring immigration and emigration, the population of Swiss citizens decreased by 1 while the foreign population remained the same. The total Swiss population change in 2008 (from all sources, including moves across municipal borders) was an increase of 17 and the non-Swiss population increased by 4 people. This represents a population growth rate of 8.8%.

The age distribution, as of 2009, in Chabrey is; 29 children or 10.9% of the population are between 0 and 9 years old and 33 teenagers or 12.4% are between 10 and 19. Of the adult population, 25 people or 9.4% of the population are between 20 and 29 years old. 44 people or 16.5% are between 30 and 39, 43 people or 16.1% are between 40 and 49, and 44 people or 16.5% are between 50 and 59. The senior population distribution is 25 people or 9.4% of the population are between 60 and 69 years old, 14 people or 5.2% are between 70 and 79 years old, 9 people or 3.4% are 80 and 89, and 1 person who is 90 and older.

As of 2000, there were 83 people who were single and never married in the municipality. There were 91 married individuals, 15 widows or widowers and 9 individuals who are divorced.

As of 2000 the average number of residents per living room was 0.58 which is about equal to the cantonal average of 0.61 per room. In this case, a room is defined as space of a housing unit of at least 4 m^{2} (43 sq ft) as normal bedrooms, dining rooms, living rooms, kitchens and habitable cellars and attics. About 61.5% of the total households were owner occupied, or in other words did not pay rent (though they may have a mortgage or a rent-to-own agreement).

As of 2000, there were 81 private households in the municipality, and an average of 2.4 persons per household. There were 28 households that consist of only one person and 10 households with five or more people. Out of a total of 82 households that answered this question, 34.1% were households made up of just one person. Of the rest of the households, there are 19 married couples without children, 29 married couples with children There were 2 single parents with a child or children. There were 3 households that were made up of unrelated people and 1 household that was made up of some sort of institution or another collective housing.

In 2000 there were 50 single family homes (or 65.8% of the total) out of a total of 76 inhabited buildings. There were 9 multi-family buildings (11.8%), along with 14 multi-purpose buildings that were mostly used for housing (18.4%) and 3 other use buildings (commercial or industrial) that also had some housing (3.9%). Of the single family homes 20 were built before 1919, while 7 were built between 1990 and 2000. The most multi-family homes (3) were built between 1946 and 1960 and the next most (2) were built before 1919. There was 1 multi-family house built between 1996 and 2000.

In 2000 there were 101 apartments in the municipality. The most common apartment size was 4 rooms of which there were 27. There were 5 single room apartments and 39 apartments with five or more rooms. Of these apartments, a total of 78 apartments (77.2% of the total) were permanently occupied, while 19 apartments (18.8%) were seasonally occupied and 4 apartments (4.0%) were empty. As of 2009, the construction rate of new housing units was 11.2 new units per 1000 residents. The vacancy rate for the municipality, in 2010, was 0%.

The historical population is given in the following chart:

== World heritage site ==
The prehistoric settlement at Pointe de Montbec I is part of the Prehistoric Pile dwellings around the Alps a UNESCO World Heritage Site.

== Politics ==
In the 2007 federal election the most popular party was the SVP which received 41.74% of the vote. The next three most popular parties were the SP (23.46%), the FDP (11.69%) and the Green Party (6.94%). In the federal election, a total of 66 votes were cast, and the voter turnout was 38.8%.

== Economy ==
As of 2010, Chabrey had an unemployment rate of 5.4%. As of 2008, there were 17 people employed in the primary economic sector and about 7 businesses involved in this sector. 5 people were employed in the secondary sector and there were 3 businesses in this sector. 21 people were employed in the tertiary sector, with 12 businesses in this sector. There were 96 residents of the municipality who were employed in some capacity, of which females made up 43.8% of the workforce.

In 2008 the total number of full-time equivalent jobs was 32. The number of jobs in the primary sector was 11, all of which were in agriculture. The number of jobs in the secondary sector was 4 of which 1 was in manufacturing and 3 (75.0%) were in construction. The number of jobs in the tertiary sector was 17. In the tertiary sector; 8 or 47.1% were in the sale or repair of motor vehicles, 2 or 11.8% were in a hotel or restaurant, 5 or 29.4% were technical professionals or scientists.

In 2000, there were 9 workers who commuted into the municipality and 56 workers who commuted away. The municipality is a net exporter of workers, with about 6.2 workers leaving the municipality for every one entering. Of the working population, 8.3% used public transportation to get to work, and 57.3% used a private car.

== Religion ==
From the 2000 census, 32 or 16.2% were Roman Catholic, while 131 or 66.2% belonged to the Swiss Reformed Church. Of the rest of the population, there was 1 individual who belongs to the Christian Catholic Church, and there were 9 individuals (or about 4.55% of the population) who belonged to another Christian church. 21 (or about 10.61% of the population) belonged to no church, are agnostic or atheist, and 3 individuals (or about 1.52% of the population) did not answer the question.

== Education ==
In Chabrey about 65 or (32.8%) of the population have completed non-mandatory upper secondary education, and 15 or (7.6%) have completed additional higher education (either University or a Fachhochschule). Of the 15 who completed tertiary schooling, 60.0% were Swiss men, 33.3% were Swiss women.

In the 2009/2010 school year there were a total of 37 students in the Chabrey school district. In the Vaud cantonal school system, two years of non-obligatory pre-school are provided by the political districts. During the school year, the political district provided pre-school care for a total of 155 children of which 83 children (53.5%) received subsidized pre-school care. The canton's primary school program requires students to attend for four years. There were 19 students in the municipal primary school program. The obligatory lower secondary school program lasts for six years and there were 18 students in those schools.

As of 2000, there were 32 students from Chabrey who attended schools outside the municipality.
