= Vully-les-Lacs =

- Municipality
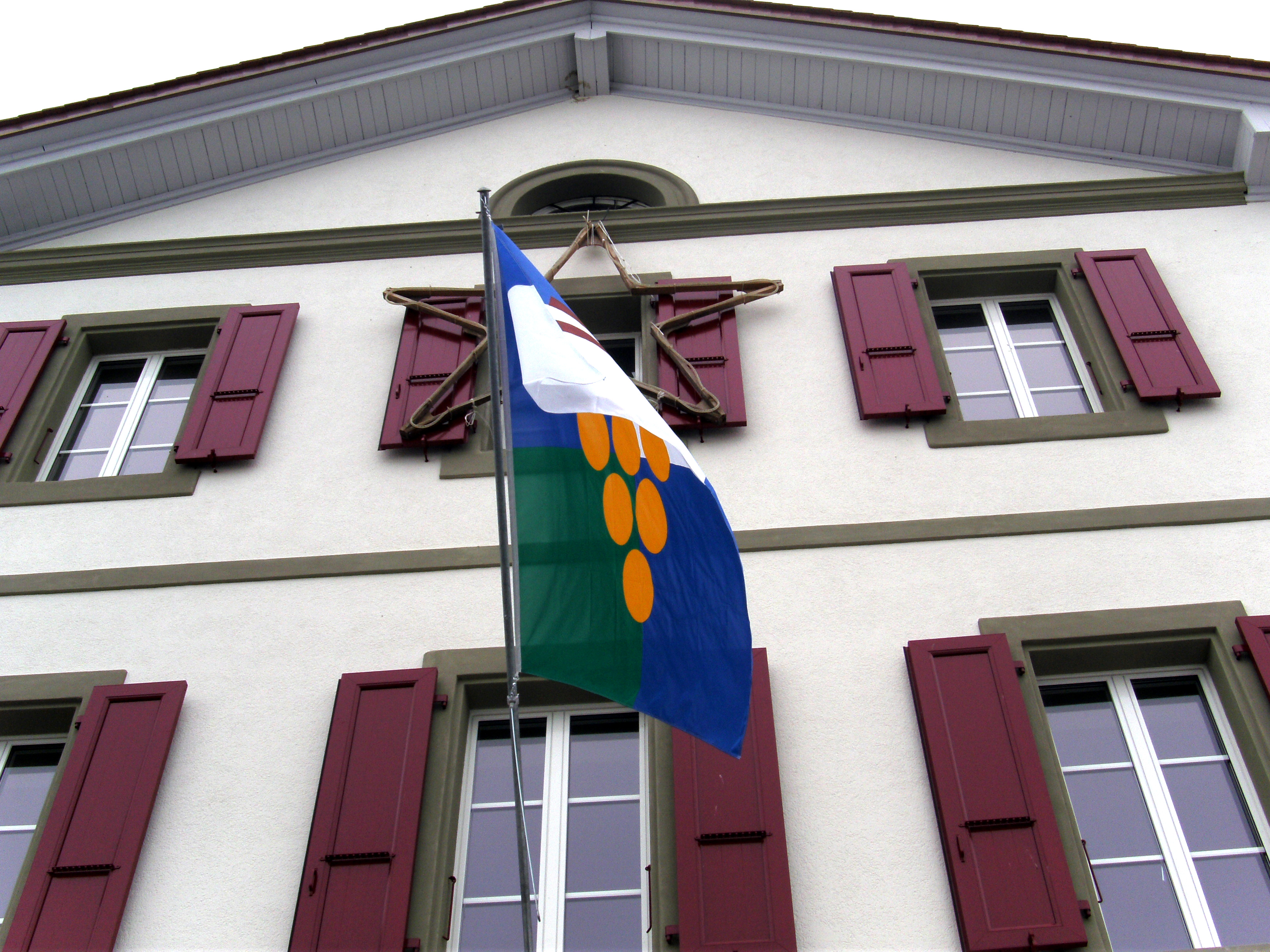
- Flag of Vully-les-Lacs

- Flag Coat of arms
- Location of Vully-les-Lacs
- Location within Switzerland Location within Canton of Vaud
- Coordinates: 46°55′N 07°01′E
- Country: Switzerland
- Canton: Vaud
- District: Broye-Vully

Government
  - Mayor: Syndic

Area
  - Total: 24.4 km^{2} (9.4 sq mi)

Population (2009)
  - Total: 621
  - Density: 25.5/km^{2} (65.9/sq mi)
- Time zone: UTC+01:00 (CET)
  - Summer (DST): UTC+02:00 (CEST)
- SFOS number: 5464
- ISO 3166 code: CH-VD
- Surrounded by: Cudrefin, Montmagny
- Website: https://www.vully-les-lacs.ch Profile (in French), SFSO statistics

Vully-les-Lacs (French pronunciation: [vyli le lak]) is a municipality in the district of Broye-Vully in the canton of Vaud in Switzerland.

The municipalities of Bellerive, Chabrey, Constantine, Montmagny, Mur (VD), Vallamand and Villars-le-Grand merged on 1 July 2011 into the new municipality of Vully-les-Lacs.

== History ==
Bellerive is first mentioned in 1228 as Balariva. Chabrey is first mentioned in 1343 as Charbrey. Constantine is first mentioned in 1228 as Costantina. Montmagny is first mentioned in the 13th Century as Manniaco. In 1458 it was mentioned as Montmagniel. Mur is first mentioned in 1396 as Murs. Vallamand is first mentioned in 1246 as Ualamant. Villars-le-Grand is first mentioned in 1246 as Uilar.

== Geography ==
Vully-les-Lacs has an area, as of 2009, of 24.35 square kilometers (9.40 mi^{2}). Of this area, 15.88 km^{2} (6.13 mi^{2}) or 65.2% is used for agricultural purposes, while 4.86 km^{2} (1.88 mi^{2}) or 20.0% is forested. Of the rest of the land, 2.68 km^{2} (1.03 mi^{2}) or 11.0% is settled (buildings or roads), 0.26 km^{2} (0.10 mi^{2}) or 1.1% is either rivers or lakes and 0.55 km^{2} (0.21 mi^{2}) or 2.3% is unproductive land.

== Historic population ==
The historical population is given in the following chart:

== Heritage sites of national significance ==
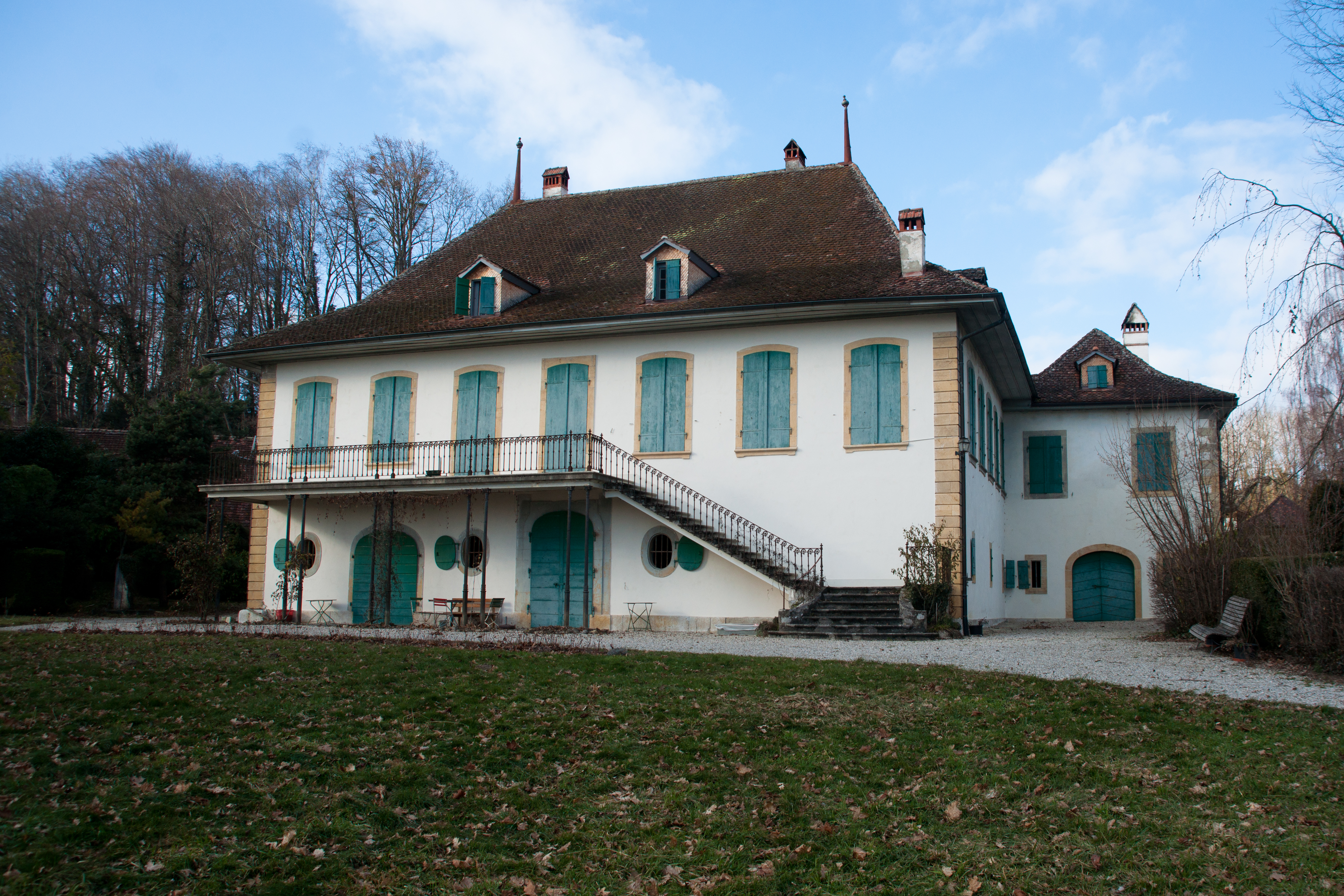
Guévaux Castle

Guévaux Castle is listed as a Swiss heritage site of national significance.

The prehistoric settlement at Chenevières de Guévaux I in Mur is part of the Prehistoric Pile dwellings around the Alps a UNESCO World Heritage Site.

The entire hamlets of Cotterd and Vallamand-Dessous (formerly in Bellerive) are designated as part of the Inventory of Swiss Heritage Sites.
