= Donatyre =

- Former municipality
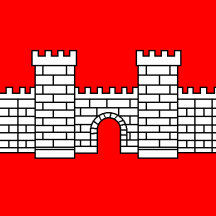
- Flag Coat of arms
- Location of Donatyre
- Location within Switzerland Location within Canton of Vaud
- Coordinates: 46°53′N 07°03′E
- Country: Switzerland
- Canton: Vaud
- District: Avenches

Area
  - Total: 1.11 km^{2} (0.43 sq mi)
- Elevation: 505 m (1,657 ft)

Population (2003)
  - Total: 140
  - Density: 130/km^{2} (330/sq mi)
- Time zone: UTC+01:00 (CET)
  - Summer (DST): UTC+02:00 (CEST)
- Postal code: 1582
- SFOS number: 5457
- ISO 3166 code: CH-VD
- Surrounded by: Avenches, Misery-Courtion (FR), Villarepos (FR)
- Website: Profile (in French),

Donatyre is a village in the district of Avenches of the Canton of Vaud, Switzerland. Since losing its status as an independent municipality on 1 July 2006, it has been part of the municipality of Avenches.

The village, which follows the old Roman wall of Aventicum, contains a chapel dedicated to Saint Thecla.
