= Avenches District =

Coordinates: 46°52′51″N 7°2′28″E

Avenches District District d'Avenches
- District
- Flag Coat of arms

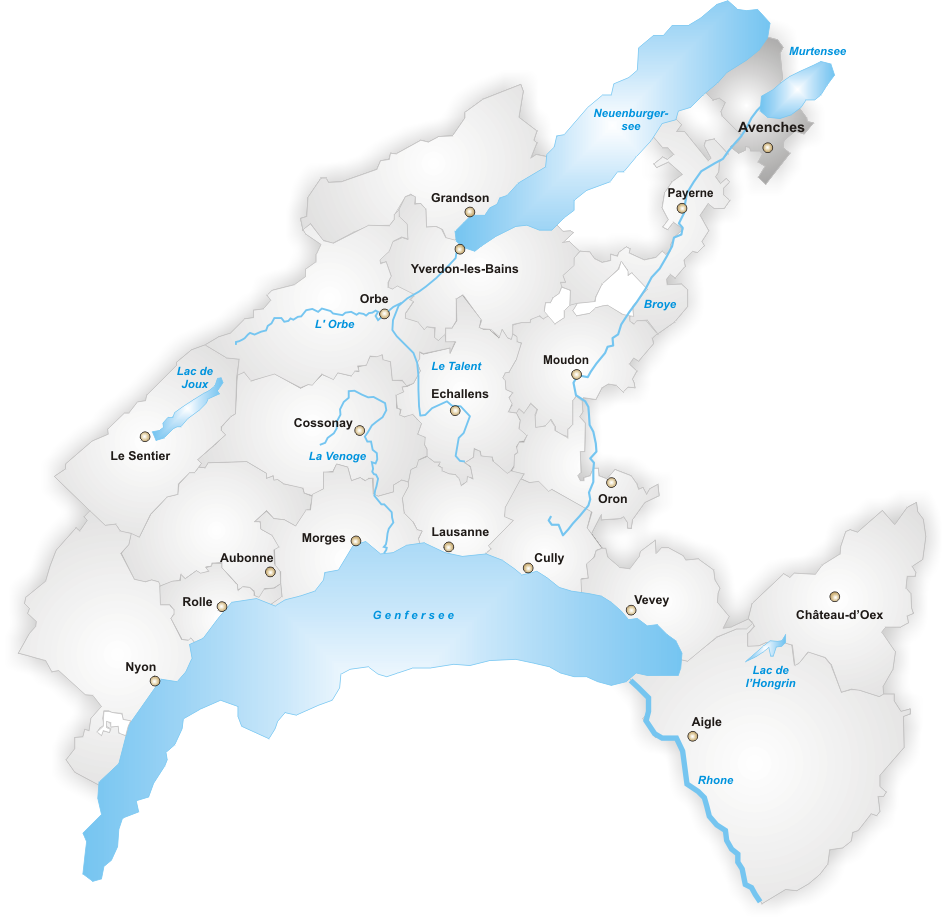
- Country: Switzerland
- Canton: Vaud
- Capital: Avenches

Area
  - Total: 59.91 km^{2} (23.13 sq mi)

Population (2006)
  - Total: 6,601
  - Density: 110.2/km^{2} (285.4/sq mi)
- Time zone: UTC+1 (CET)
  - Summer (DST): UTC+2 (CEST)
- Municipalities: 11

Avenches District is a former district of the Canton of Vaud, Switzerland. The seat of the district was the town of Avenches. It was dissolved on 31 August 2006 and all the municipalities joined the new Broye-Vully District.

The following municipalities are located in the district:

- Avenches
- Bellerive
- Chabrey
- Constantine
- Cudrefin
- Donatyre
- Faoug
- Montmagny
- Mur
- Oleyres
- Vallamand
- Villars-le-Grand

On 1 July 2006, Donatyre became part of the municipality of Avenches.
