= Faoug =

- Municipality
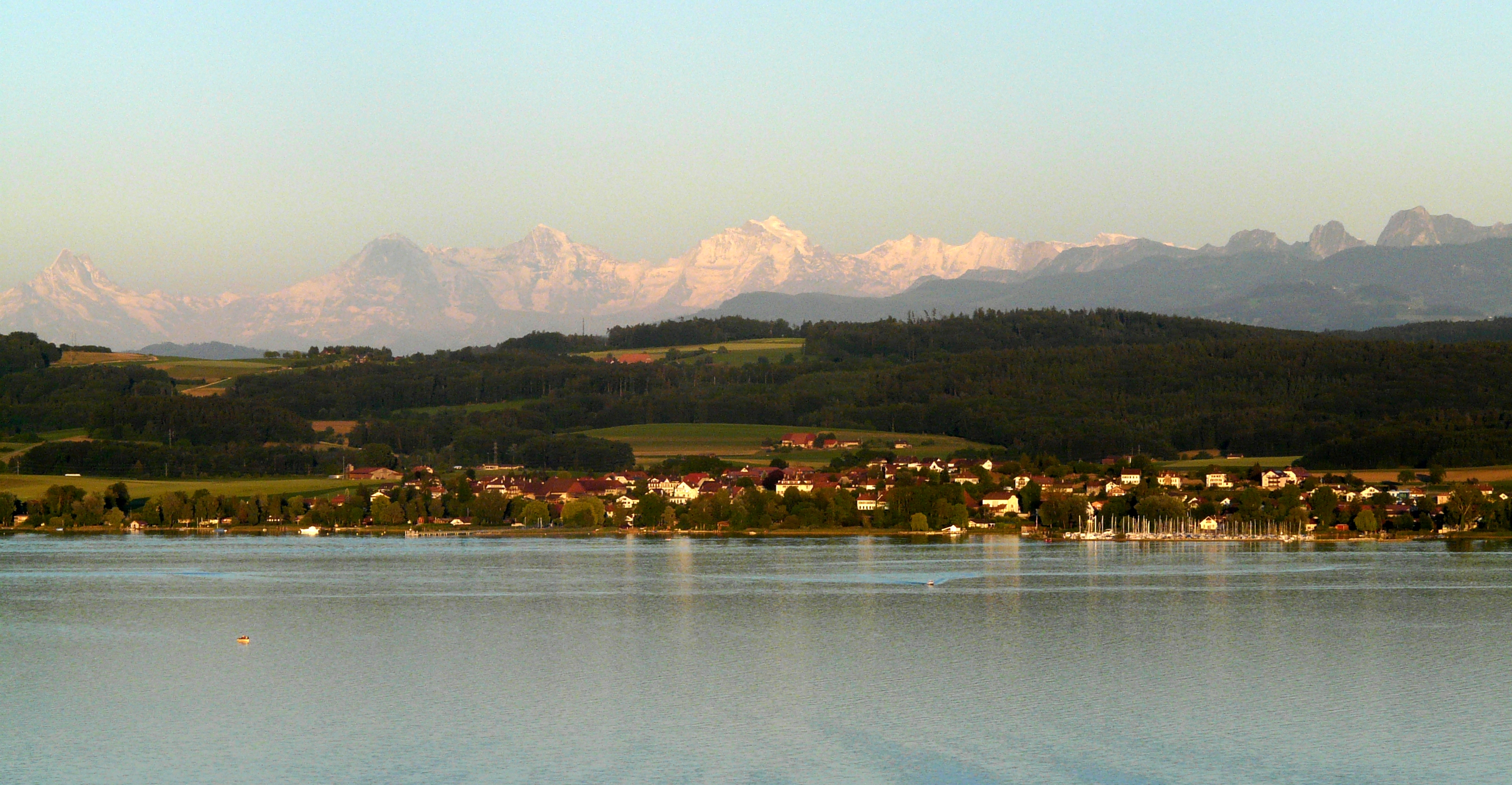
- Faoug village

- Flag Coat of arms
- Location of Faoug
- Location within Switzerland Location within Canton of Vaud
- Coordinates: 46°55′N 07°05′E
- Country: Switzerland
- Canton: Vaud
- District: Broye-Vully

Government
  - Mayor: Syndic

Area
  - Total: 3.45 km^{2} (1.33 sq mi)
- Elevation: 449 m (1,473 ft)

Population (2003)
  - Total: 594
  - Density: 172/km^{2} (446/sq mi)
- Time zone: UTC+01:00 (CET)
  - Summer (DST): UTC+02:00 (CEST)
- Postal code: 1595
- SFOS number: 5458
- ISO 3166 code: CH-VD
- Surrounded by: Avenches, Clavaleyres (BE), Courgevaux (FR), Greng (FR), Haut-Vully (FR), Mur, Vallamand, Villarepos (FR)
- Website: www.faoug.ch

Faoug (French pronunciation: [fu]) is a municipality in the district of Broye-Vully in the canton of Vaud in Switzerland.

== History ==
Faoug is first mentioned in 1228 as Fol.

== Geography ==
Aerial view (1946)

Faoug has an area, as of 2009, of 3.45 square kilometers (1.33 sq mi). Of this area, 1.9 km^{2} (0.73 sq mi) or 55.1% is used for agricultural purposes, while 0.87 km^{2} (0.34 sq mi) or 25.2% is forested. Of the rest of the land, 0.68 km^{2} (0.26 sq mi) or 19.7% is settled (buildings or roads) and 0.02 km^{2} (4.9 acres) or 0.6% is unproductive land.

Of the built up area, industrial buildings made up 1.2% of the total area while housing and buildings made up 9.0% and transportation infrastructure made up 9.3%. Out of the forested land, 23.5% of the total land area is heavily forested and 1.7% is covered with orchards or small clusters of trees. Of the agricultural land, 48.7% is used for growing crops and 5.2% is pastures, while 1.2% is used for orchards or vine crops.

The municipality was part of the Avenches District until it was dissolved on 31 August 2006, and Faoug became part of the new district of Broye-Vully.

The municipality is located on the southern shore of Lake Murten along the border with the Canton of Fribourg.

== Coat of arms ==
The blazon of the municipal coat of arms is Per pale, 1. Azure, on a mount Vert a Peacock Azure with Tail proper, 2. Gules, a bush eradicated Vert flowered Argent.

== Demographics ==
Faoug has a population (as of December 2020) of 879. As of 2008, 15.2% of the population are resident foreign nationals. Over the last 10 years (1999–2009 ) the population has changed at a rate of 28.5%. It has changed at a rate of 22.3% due to migration and at a rate of 5.6% due to births and deaths.

Most of the population (as of 2000) speaks French (317 or 56.7%), with German being second most common (191 or 34.2%) and Portuguese being third (18 or 3.2%). There are 9 people who speak Italian.

Of the population in the municipality 149 or about 26.7% were born in Faoug and lived there in 2000. There were 63 or 11.3% who were born in the same canton, while 249 or 44.5% were born somewhere else in Switzerland, and 93 or 16.6% were born outside of Switzerland.

In 2008 there were 10 live births to Swiss citizens and 1 birth to non-Swiss citizens, and in same time span there were 6 deaths of Swiss citizens. Ignoring immigration and emigration, the population of Swiss citizens increased by 4 while the foreign population increased by 1. There were 3 Swiss men who emigrated from Switzerland. At the same time, there were 4 non-Swiss men and 9 non-Swiss women who immigrated from another country to Switzerland. The total Swiss population change in 2008 (from all sources, including moves across municipal borders) was an increase of 25 and the non-Swiss population increased by 15 people. This represents a population growth rate of 5.8%.

The age distribution, as of 2009, in Faoug is; 96 children or 13.0% of the population are between 0 and 9 years old and 68 teenagers or 9.2% are between 10 and 19. Of the adult population, 73 people or 9.9% of the population are between 20 and 29 years old. 117 people or 15.8% are between 30 and 39, 147 people or 19.9% are between 40 and 49, and 110 people or 14.9% are between 50 and 59. The senior population distribution is 70 people or 9.5% of the population are between 60 and 69 years old, 34 people or 4.6% are between 70 and 79, there are 22 people or 3.0% who are between 80 and 89, and there are 2 people or 0.3% who are 90 and older.

As of 2000, there were 241 people who were single and never married in the municipality. There were 265 married individuals, 23 widows or widowers and 30 individuals who are divorced.

As of 2000, there were 225 private households in the municipality, and an average of 2.4 persons per household. There were 70 households that consist of only one person and 15 households with five or more people. Out of a total of 238 households that answered this question, 29.4% were households made up of just one person and there were 2 adults who lived with their parents. Of the rest of the households, there are 61 married couples without children, 77 married couples with children There were 13 single parents with a child or children. There were 2 households that were made up of unrelated people and 13 households that were made up of some sort of institution or another collective housing.

In 2000 there were 149 single family homes (or 65.6% of the total) out of a total of 227 inhabited buildings. There were 48 multi-family buildings (21.1%), along with 17 multi-purpose buildings that were mostly used for housing (7.5%) and 13 other use buildings (commercial or industrial) that also had some housing (5.7%). Of the single family homes 16 were built before 1919, while 4 were built between 1990 and 2000. The greatest number of single family homes (33) were built between 1946 and 1960. The most multi-family homes (23) were built before 1919 and the next most (9) were built between 1919 and 1945. There were 2 multi-family houses built between 1996 and 2000.

In 2000 there were 329 apartments in the municipality. The most common apartment size was 4 rooms of which there were 101. There were 11 single room apartments and 94 apartments with five or more rooms. Of these apartments, a total of 225 apartments (68.4% of the total) were permanently occupied, while 77 apartments (23.4%) were seasonally occupied and 27 apartments (8.2%) were empty. As of 2009, the construction rate of new housing units was 6.8 new units per 1000 residents. The vacancy rate for the municipality, in 2010, was 9.57%.

The historical population is given in the following chart:

== Heritage sites of national significance ==
The Domaine Cornaz et ses dépendances is listed as a Swiss heritage site of national significance.

== Politics ==
In the 2007 federal election the most popular party was the SP which received 23.94% of the vote. The next three most popular parties were the SVP (19.73%), the Green Party (15.03%) and the FDP (14.64%). In the federal election, a total of 164 votes were cast, and the voter turnout was 36.9%.

== Economy ==
As of 2010, Faoug had an unemployment rate of 3.3%. As of 2008, there were 25 people employed in the primary economic sector and about 11 businesses involved in this sector. 27 people were employed in the secondary sector and there were 9 businesses in this sector. 54 people were employed in the tertiary sector, with 16 businesses in this sector. There were 296 residents of the municipality who were employed in some capacity, of which females made up 43.9% of the workforce.

In 2008 the total number of full-time equivalent jobs was 79. The number of jobs in the primary sector was 16, of which 15 were in agriculture and 1 was in forestry or lumber production. The number of jobs in the secondary sector was 22 of which 18 or (81.8%) were in manufacturing and 3 (13.6%) were in construction. The number of jobs in the tertiary sector was 41. In the tertiary sector; 18 or 43.9% were in wholesale or retail sales or the repair of motor vehicles, 12 or 29.3% were in a hotel or restaurant, 1 was in the information industry, 1 was a technical professional or scientist, 4 or 9.8% were in education and 1 was in health care.

In 2000, there were 42 workers who commuted into the municipality and 218 workers who commuted away. The municipality is a net exporter of workers, with about 5.2 workers leaving the municipality for every one entering. Of the working population, 11.5% used public transportation to get to work, and 61.8% used a private car.

== Religion ==
From the 2000 census, 174 or 31.1% were Roman Catholic, while 282 or 50.4% belonged to the Swiss Reformed Church. Of the rest of the population, there were 2 members of an Orthodox church (or about 0.36% of the population), and there were 31 individuals (or about 5.55% of the population) who belonged to another Christian church. There were 3 (or about 0.54% of the population) who were Islamic. There was 1 person who was Buddhist and 3 individuals who belonged to another church. 58 (or about 10.38% of the population) belonged to no church, are agnostic or atheist, and 5 individuals (or about 0.89% of the population) did not answer the question.

== Education ==
In Faoug about 230 or (41.1%) of the population have completed non-mandatory upper secondary education, and 70 or (12.5%) have completed additional higher education (either university or a Fachhochschule). Of the 70 who completed tertiary schooling, 62.9% were Swiss men, 30.0% were Swiss women.

In the 2009/2010 school year there were a total of 86 students in the Faoug school district. In the Vaud cantonal school system, two years of non-obligatory pre-school are provided by the political districts. During the school year, the political district provided pre-school care for a total of 155 children of which 83 children (53.5%) received subsidized pre-school care. The canton's primary school program requires students to attend for four years. There were 53 students in the municipal primary school program. The obligatory lower secondary school program lasts for six years and there were 32 students in those schools. There were also 1 students who were home schooled or attended another non-traditional school.

As of 2000, there were 26 students in Faoug who came from another municipality, while 70 residents attended schools outside the municipality.

== Transportation ==
The municipality has a railway station, Faoug, on the Palézieux–Lyss railway line. It has regular service to Lausanne, Bern, and Kerzers.
