= Villars-le-Grand =

- Former municipality
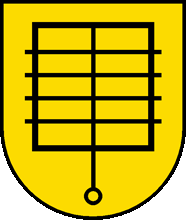
- Coat of arms
- Location of Villars-le-Grand
- Location within Switzerland Location within Canton of Vaud
- Coordinates: 46°54′N 6°59′E
- Country: Switzerland
- Canton: Vaud
- District: Broye-Vully

Government
  - Mayor: Jean-Pierre Blaser

Area
  - Total: 4.21 km^{2} (1.63 sq mi)
- Elevation: 470 m (1,540 ft)

Population (2009)
  - Total: 275
  - Density: 65.3/km^{2} (169/sq mi)
- Demonym: Les Cigognes
- Time zone: UTC+01:00 (CET)
  - Summer (DST): UTC+02:00 (CEST)
- Postal code: 1584
- SFOS number: 5463
- ISO 3166 code: CH-VD
- Surrounded by: Montmagny, Avenches, Saint-Aubin (FR), Delley-Portalban (FR), Chabrey
- Website: www.vully-les-lacs.ch

Villars-le-Grand is a former municipality in the district of Broye-Vully in the canton of Vaud in Switzerland.

The municipalities of Bellerive, Chabrey, Constantine, Montmagny, Mur, Vallamand and Villars-le-Grand merged on 1 July 2011 into the new municipality of Vully-les-Lacs.

== History ==
Villars-le-Grand is first mentioned in 1246 as Uilar.

== Geography ==
Villars-le-Grand has an area, as of 2009, of 4.2 square kilometers (1.6 sq mi). Of this area, 3.68 km^{2} (1.42 sq mi) or 87.6% is used for agricultural purposes, while 0.13 km^{2} (0.050 sq mi) or 3.1% is forested. Of the rest of the land, 0.35 km^{2} (0.14 sq mi) or 8.3% is settled (buildings or roads), 0.08 km^{2} (20 acres) or 1.9% is either rivers or lakes.

Of the built up area, housing and buildings made up 2.9% and transportation infrastructure made up 5.2%. Out of the forested land, 1.7% of the total land area is heavily forested and 1.4% is covered with orchards or small clusters of trees. Of the agricultural land, 77.4% is used for growing crops and 7.9% is pastures, while 2.4% is used for orchards or vine crops. All the water in the municipality is flowing water.

The municipality was part of the Avenches District until it was dissolved on 31 August 2006, and Villars-le-Grand became part of the new district of Broye-Vully.

== Coat of arms ==
The blazon of the municipal coat of arms is Or, a Grill Sable.

== Demographics ==
Villars-le-Grand has a population (as of 2009) of 275. As of 2008, 5.4% of the population are resident foreign nationals. Over the last 10 years (1999–2009 ) the population has changed at a rate of -3.5%. It has changed at a rate of -1.8% due to migration and at a rate of -1.1% due to births and deaths.

Most of the population (as of 2000) speaks French (262 or 90.3%), with German being second most common (24 or 8.3%) and Portuguese being third (2 or 0.7%). There is 1 person who speaks Italian.

Of the population in the municipality 134 or about 46.2% were born in Villars-le-Grand and lived there in 2000. There were 55 or 19.0% who were born in the same canton, while 72 or 24.8% were born somewhere else in Switzerland, and 16 or 5.5% were born outside of Switzerland.

In 2008 there were 2 live births to Swiss citizens and 2 births to non-Swiss citizens. Ignoring immigration and emigration, the population of Swiss citizens increased by 2 while the foreign population increased by 2. The total Swiss population change in 2008 (from all sources, including moves across municipal borders) was a decrease of 10 and the non-Swiss population increased by 2 people. This represents a population growth rate of -2.8%.

The age distribution, as of 2009, in Villars-le-Grand is; 24 children or 8.7% of the population are between 0 and 9 years old and 32 teenagers or 11.6% are between 10 and 19. Of the adult population, 23 people or 8.4% of the population are between 20 and 29 years old. 24 people or 8.7% are between 30 and 39, 44 people or 16.0% are between 40 and 49, and 38 people or 13.8% are between 50 and 59. The senior population distribution is 49 people or 17.8% of the population are between 60 and 69 years old, 23 people or 8.4% are between 70 and 79, there are 14 people or 5.1% who are between 80 and 89, and there are 4 people or 1.5% who are 90 and older.

As of 2000, there were 115 people who were single and never married in the municipality. There were 154 married individuals, 12 widows or widowers and 9 individuals who are divorced.

As of 2000 the average number of residents per living room was 0.61 which is about equal to the cantonal average of 0.61 per room. In this case, a room is defined as space of a housing unit of at least 4 m^{2} (43 sq ft) as normal bedrooms, dining rooms, living rooms, kitchens and habitable cellars and attics. About 66.7% of the total households were owner occupied, or in other words did not pay rent (though they may have a mortgage or a rent-to-own agreement).

As of 2000, there were 107 private households in the municipality, and an average of 2.7 persons per household. There were 19 households that consist of only one person and 9 households with five or more people. Out of a total of 109 households that answered this question, 17.4% were households made up of just one person and there were 2 adults who lived with their parents. Of the rest of the households, there are 39 married couples without children, 41 married couples with children There were 6 single parents with a child or children.

In 2000 there were 47 single family homes (or 52.2% of the total) out of a total of 90 inhabited buildings. There were 10 multi-family buildings (11.1%), along with 30 multi-purpose buildings that were mostly used for housing (33.3%) and 3 other use buildings (commercial or industrial) that also had some housing (3.3%). Of the single family homes 17 were built before 1919, while 6 were built between 1990 and 2000. The most multi-family homes (4) were built before 1919 and the next most (1) were built between 1919 and 1945. There was 1 multi-family house built between 1996 and 2000.

In 2000 there were 115 apartments in the municipality. The most common apartment size was 4 rooms of which there were 39. There were single room apartments and 43 apartments with five or more rooms. Of these apartments, a total of 102 apartments (88.7% of the total) were permanently occupied, while 6 apartments (5.2%) were seasonally occupied and 7 apartments (6.1%) were empty. As of 2009, the construction rate of new housing units was 3.6 new units per 1000 residents. The vacancy rate for the municipality, in 2010, was 0.79%.

The historical population is given in the following chart:

== Politics ==
In the 2007 federal election the most popular party was the SVP which received 39.93% of the vote. The next three most popular parties were the FDP (24.39%), the SP (15.18%) and the CVP (5.26%). In the federal election, a total of 96 votes were cast, and the voter turnout was 43.4%.

== Economy ==
As of 2010, Villars-le-Grand had an unemployment rate of 2.1%. As of 2008, there were 67 people employed in the primary economic sector and about 16 businesses involved in this sector. 1 person was employed in the secondary sector and there was 1 business in this sector. 5 people were employed in the tertiary sector, with 1 business in this sector. There were 150 residents of the municipality who were employed in some capacity, of which females made up 44.7% of the workforce.

In 2008 the total number of full-time equivalent jobs was 42. The number of jobs in the primary sector was 38, all of which were in agriculture. The number of jobs in the secondary sector was 1, in manufacturing. The number of jobs in the tertiary sector was 3, all in education.

In 2000, there were 9 workers who commuted into the municipality and 100 workers who commuted away. The municipality is a net exporter of workers, with about 11.1 workers leaving the municipality for every one entering. Of the working population, 5.3% used public transportation to get to work, and 60% used a private car.

== Religion ==
From the 2000 census, 78 or 26.9% were Roman Catholic, while 174 or 60.0% belonged to the Swiss Reformed Church. There were 3 (or about 1.03% of the population) who were Islamic. 23 (or about 7.93% of the population) belonged to no church, are agnostic or atheist, and 12 individuals (or about 4.14% of the population) did not answer the question.

== Education ==
In Villars-le-Grand about 98 or (33.8%) of the population have completed non-mandatory upper secondary education, and 23 or (7.9%) have completed additional higher education (either University or a Fachhochschule). Of the 23 who completed tertiary schooling, 69.6% were Swiss men, 21.7% were Swiss women.

In the 2009/2010 school year there were a total of 36 students in the Villars-le-Grand school district. In the Vaud cantonal school system, two years of non-obligatory pre-school are provided by the political districts. During the school year, the political district provided pre-school care for a total of 155 children of which 83 children (53.5%) received subsidized pre-school care. The canton's primary school program requires students to attend for four years. There were 17 students in the municipal primary school program. The obligatory lower secondary school program lasts for six years and there were 18 students in those schools. There were also 1 students who were home schooled or attended another non-traditional school.

As of 2000, there were 18 students in Villars-le-Grand who came from another municipality, while 29 residents attended schools outside the municipality.
