= Constantine, Switzerland =

Constantine
- Former municipality
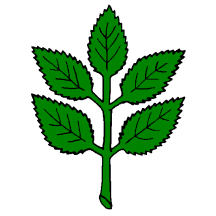
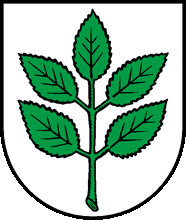
- Flag Coat of arms
- Location of Constantine
- Location within Switzerland Location within Canton of Vaud
- Coordinates: 46°55′N 07°01′E
- Country: Switzerland
- Canton: Vaud
- District: Broye-Vully

Area
  - Total: 2.81 km^{2} (1.08 sq mi)
- Elevation: 510 m (1,670 ft)

Population (2009)
  - Total: 301
  - Density: 107/km^{2} (277/sq mi)
- Time zone: UTC+01:00 (CET)
  - Summer (DST): UTC+02:00 (CEST)
- Postal code: 1587
- SFOS number: 5455
- ISO 3166 code: CH-VD
- Surrounded by: Avenches, Bellerive, Montmagny, Vallamand
- Website: www.vully-les-lacs.ch

Constantine (French pronunciation: [kɔ̃stɑ̃tin]) is a former municipality in the district of Broye-Vully in the canton of Vaud in Switzerland.

The municipalities of Bellerive, Chabrey, Constantine, Montmagny, Mur, Vallamand and Villars-le-Grand merged on 1 July 2011 into the new municipality of Vully-les-Lacs.

== History ==
Constantine is first mentioned in 1228 as Costantina.

== Geography ==
Constantine has an area, as of 2009, of 2.81 square kilometers (1.08 sq mi). Of this area, 1.93 km^{2} (0.75 sq mi) or 68.7% is used for agricultural purposes, while 0.4 km^{2} (0.15 sq mi) or 14.2% is forested. Of the rest of the land, 0.42 km^{2} (0.16 sq mi) or 14.9% is settled (buildings or roads), 0.05 km^{2} (12 acres) or 1.8% is either rivers or lakes and 0.01 km^{2} (2.5 acres) or 0.4% is unproductive land.

Of the built up area, housing and buildings made up 7.8% and transportation infrastructure made up 2.8%. while parks, green belts and sports fields made up 3.6%. Out of the forested land, 12.8% of the total land area is heavily forested and 1.4% is covered with orchards or small clusters of trees. Of the agricultural land, 55.9% is used for growing crops and 7.8% is pastures, while 5.0% is used for orchards or vine crops. All the water in the municipality is flowing water.

The municipality was part of the Avenches District until it was dissolved on 31 August 2006, and Constantine became part of the new district of Broye-Vully.

The municipality is located on the southern slope of Mont Vully. It consists of the village of Constantine and the southern portion of the village of Salavaux.

== Coat of arms ==
The blazon of the municipal coat of arms is Argent, a Branch palewise with five Leaves Vert.

== Demographics ==
Constantine has a population (as of 2009) of 301. As of 2008, 8.5% of the population are resident foreign nationals. Over the last 10 years (1999–2009 ) the population has changed at a rate of 14.4%. It has changed at a rate of 17.1% due to migration and at a rate of -2.7% due to births and deaths.

Most of the population (as of 2000) speaks French (232 or 82.9%), with German being second most common (30 or 10.7%) and Portuguese being third (10 or 3.6%).

Of the population in the municipality 91 or about 32.5% were born in Constantine and lived there in 2000. There were 82 or 29.3% who were born in the same canton, while 74 or 26.4% were born somewhere else in Switzerland, and 33 or 11.8% were born outside of Switzerland.

In 2008 there were live births to Swiss citizens and were 4 deaths of Swiss citizens. Ignoring immigration and emigration, the population of Swiss citizens decreased by 4 while the foreign population remained the same. The total Swiss population change in 2008 (from all sources, including moves across municipal borders) was a decrease of 4 and the non-Swiss population increased by 5 people. This represents a population growth rate of 0.4%.

The age distribution, as of 2009, in Constantine is; 24 children or 8.0% of the population are between 0 and 9 years old and 39 teenagers or 13.0% are between 10 and 19. Of the adult population, 35 people or 11.6% of the population are between 20 and 29 years old. 35 people or 11.6% are between 30 and 39, 48 people or 15.9% are between 40 and 49, and 37 people or 12.3% are between 50 and 59. The senior population distribution is 39 people or 13.0% of the population are between 60 and 69 years old, 28 people or 9.3% are between 70 and 79, there are 13 people or 4.3% who are between 80 and 89, and there are 3 people or 1.0% who are 90 and older.

As of 2000, there were 105 people who were single and never married in the municipality. There were 141 married individuals, 18 widows or widowers and 16 individuals who are divorced.

As of 2000 the average number of residents per living room was 0.53 which is fewer people per room than the cantonal average of 0.61 per room. In this case, a room is defined as space of a housing unit of at least 4 m^{2} (43 sq ft) as normal bedrooms, dining rooms, living rooms, kitchens and habitable cellars and attics. About 60.6% of the total households were owner occupied, or in other words did not pay rent (though they may have a mortgage or a rent-to-own agreement).

As of 2000, there were 112 private households in the municipality, and an average of 2.3 persons per household. There were 36 households that consist of only one person and 8 households with five or more people. Out of a total of 116 households that answered this question, 31.0% were households made up of just one person and there were 2 adults who lived with their parents. Of the rest of the households, there are 32 married couples without children, 34 married couples with children There were 7 single parents with a child or children. There was 1 household that was made up of unrelated people and 4 households that were made up of some sort of institution or another collective housing.

In 2000 there were 48 single family homes (or 53.3% of the total) out of a total of 90 inhabited buildings. There were 14 multi-family buildings (15.6%), along with 19 multi-purpose buildings that were mostly used for housing (21.1%) and 9 other use buildings (commercial or industrial) that also had some housing (10.0%). Of the single family homes 14 were built before 1919, while 11 were built between 1990 and 2000. The most multi-family homes (5) were built before 1919 and the next most (4) were built between 1961 and 1970.

In 2000 there were 123 apartments in the municipality. The most common apartment size was 4 rooms of which there were 38. There were 6 single room apartments and 43 apartments with five or more rooms. Of these apartments, a total of 99 apartments (80.5% of the total) were permanently occupied, while 16 apartments (13.0%) were seasonally occupied and 8 apartments (6.5%) were empty. As of 2009, the construction rate of new housing units was 29.9 new units per 1000 residents. The vacancy rate for the municipality, in 2010, was 0%.

The historical population is given in the following chart:

== Politics ==
In the 2007 federal election the most popular party was the FDP which received 39.93% of the vote. The next three most popular parties were the SP (21.48%), the SVP (19.09%) and the Green Party (5.48%). In the federal election, a total of 107 votes were cast, and the voter turnout was 51.7%.

== Economy ==
As of 2010, Constantine had an unemployment rate of 1.1%. As of 2008, there were 34 people employed in the primary economic sector and about 10 businesses involved in this sector. 8 people were employed in the secondary sector and there were 3 businesses in this sector. 63 people were employed in the tertiary sector, with 20 businesses in this sector. There were 140 residents of the municipality who were employed in some capacity, of which females made up 39.3% of the workforce.

In 2008 the total number of full-time equivalent jobs was 77. The number of jobs in the primary sector was 28, all of which were in agriculture. The number of jobs in the secondary sector was 7 of which 3 or (42.9%) were in manufacturing and 4 (57.1%) were in construction. The number of jobs in the tertiary sector was 42. In the tertiary sector; 14 or 33.3% were in the sale or repair of motor vehicles, 3 or 7.1% were in the movement and storage of goods, 13 or 31.0% were in a hotel or restaurant, 7 or 16.7% were technical professionals or scientists, 2 or 4.8% were in education.

In 2000, there were 30 workers who commuted into the municipality and 83 workers who commuted away. The municipality is a net exporter of workers, with about 2.8 workers leaving the municipality for every one entering. Of the working population, 5% used public transportation to get to work, and 60% used a private car.

== Religion ==
From the 2000 census, 68 or 24.3% were Roman Catholic, while 194 or 69.3% belonged to the Swiss Reformed Church. Of the rest of the population, and there were 3 individuals (or about 1.07% of the population) who belonged to another Christian church. There was 1 person who was Buddhist. 13 (or about 4.64% of the population) belonged to no church, are agnostic or atheist, and 1 individuals (or about 0.36% of the population) did not answer the question.

== Education ==
In Constantine about 112 or (40.0%) of the population have completed non-mandatory upper secondary education, and 33 or (11.8%) have completed additional higher education (either University or a Fachhochschule). Of the 33 who completed tertiary schooling, 63.6% were Swiss men, 18.2% were Swiss women.

In the 2009/2010 school year there were a total of 29 students in the Constantine school district. In the Vaud cantonal school system, two years of non-obligatory pre-school are provided by the political districts. During the school year, the political district provided pre-school care for a total of 155 children of which 83 children (53.5%) received subsidized pre-school care. The canton's primary school program requires students to attend for four years. There were 13 students in the municipal primary school program. The obligatory lower secondary school program lasts for six years and there were 16 students in those schools.

As of 2000, there were 22 students in Constantine who came from another municipality, while 47 residents attended schools outside the municipality.
