= Bellerive, Switzerland =

Bellerive
- Former municipality
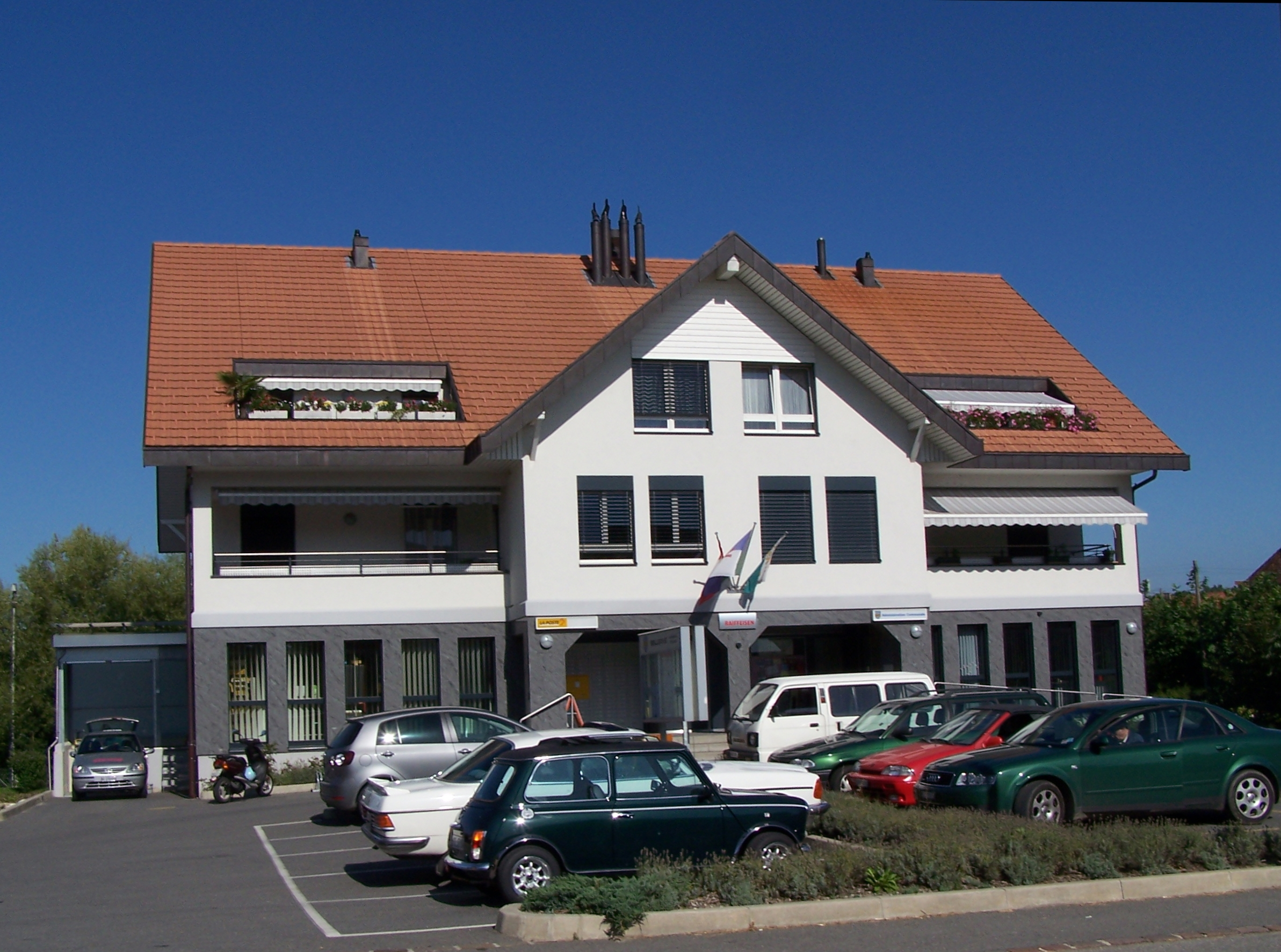
- Town Hall of Bellerive

- Flag Coat of arms
- Location of Bellerive
- Location within Switzerland Location within Canton of Vaud
- Coordinates: 46°55′N 07°01′E
- Country: Switzerland
- Canton: Vaud
- District: Broye-Vully

Government
  - Mayor: Claude Bessard

Area
  - Total: 2.26 km^{2} (0.87 sq mi)
- Elevation: 533 m (1,749 ft)

Population (2009)
  - Total: 621
  - Density: 275/km^{2} (712/sq mi)
- Demonym: Lè Renaille
- Time zone: UTC+01:00 (CET)
  - Summer (DST): UTC+02:00 (CEST)
- Postal codes: 1585 Bellerive; 1585 Cotterd; 1585 Salavaux; 1586 Vallamand-Dessous
- SFOS number: 5452
- ISO 3166 code: CH-VD
- Localities: Bellerive, Cotterd, Salavaux, Vallamand-Dessous
- Surrounded by: Cudrefin, Vallamand, Constantine, Montmagny
- Website: vully-les-lacs.ch

Bellerive (French pronunciation: [bɛlʁiv]) is a former municipality in the district of Broye-Vully in the canton of Vaud in Switzerland.

The municipalities of Bellerive, Chabrey, Constantine, Montmagny, Mur (VD), Vallamand and Villars-le-Grand merged on 1 July 2011 into the new municipality of Vully-les-Lacs.

== History ==
Bellerive is first mentioned in 1228 as Balariva.

== Geography ==
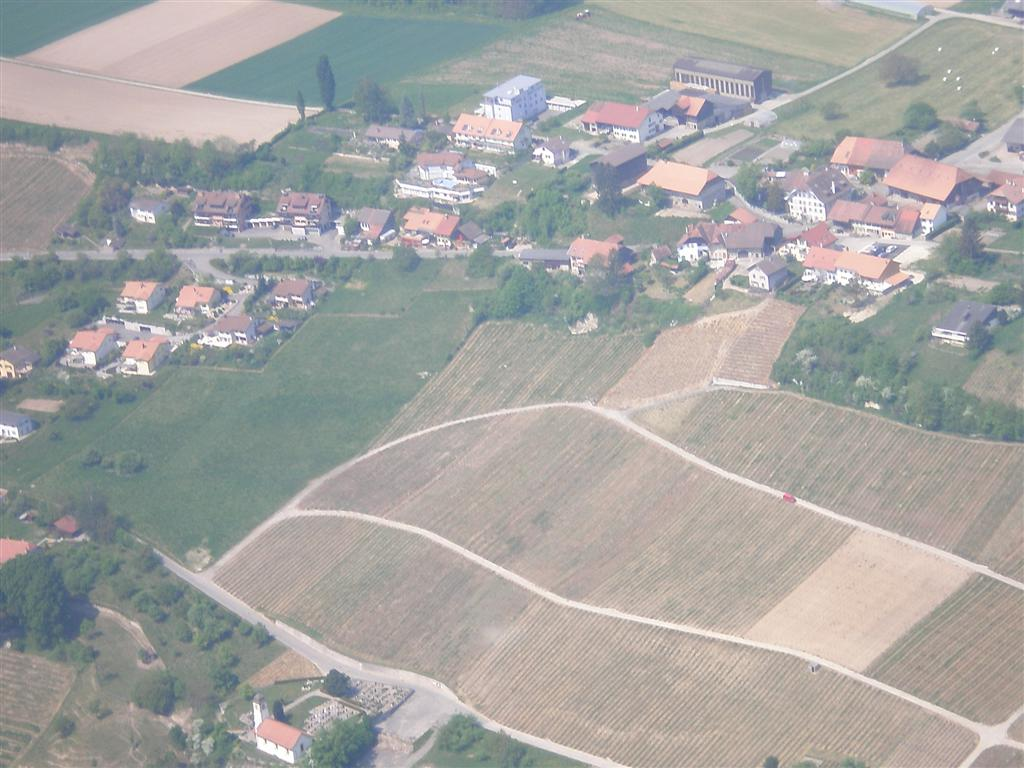
Bellerive

Bellerive has an area, as of 2009, of 2.26 square kilometers (0.87 sq mi). Of this area, 1.39 km^{2} (0.54 sq mi) or 61.5% is used for agricultural purposes, while 0.22 km^{2} (0.085 sq mi) or 9.7% is forested. Of the rest of the land, 0.52 km^{2} (0.20 sq mi) or 23.0% is settled (buildings or roads), 0.04 km^{2} (9.9 acres) or 1.8% is either rivers or lakes and 0.04 km^{2} (9.9 acres) or 1.8% is unproductive land.

Of the built up area, housing and buildings made up 15.5% and transportation infrastructure made up 6.2%. Out of the forested land, 8.0% of the total land area is heavily forested and 1.8% is covered with orchards or small clusters of trees. Of the agricultural land, 35.8% is used for growing crops and 13.7% is pastures, while 11.9% is used for orchards or vine crops. All the water in the municipality is flowing water.

The municipality is located in the Broye-Vully District, on the slopes of Mont Vully. It consists of the village of Bellerive and the hamlets of Cotterd (with a church, school and 18th Century castle), Vallamand-Dessous, part of Salavaux and numerous farm houses. Bellerive (533 m (1,749 ft)) is located on the Vully, between Lake Murten and Lake Neuchatel, 5 km (3.1 mi) north of Avenches. The main part of the village Salavaux (436 m (1,430 ft)), located over the Broye, the villages Cotterd (481 m (1,578 ft)), on the Vully, and Vallamand-Dessous (433 m (1,421 ft)), on the west side of lake Murten, belong to the municipality of Bellerive.

== Coat of arms ==
The blazon of the municipal coat of arms is Paly of six Argent and Azure, on a fess Or three helmets Sable.

== Demographics ==
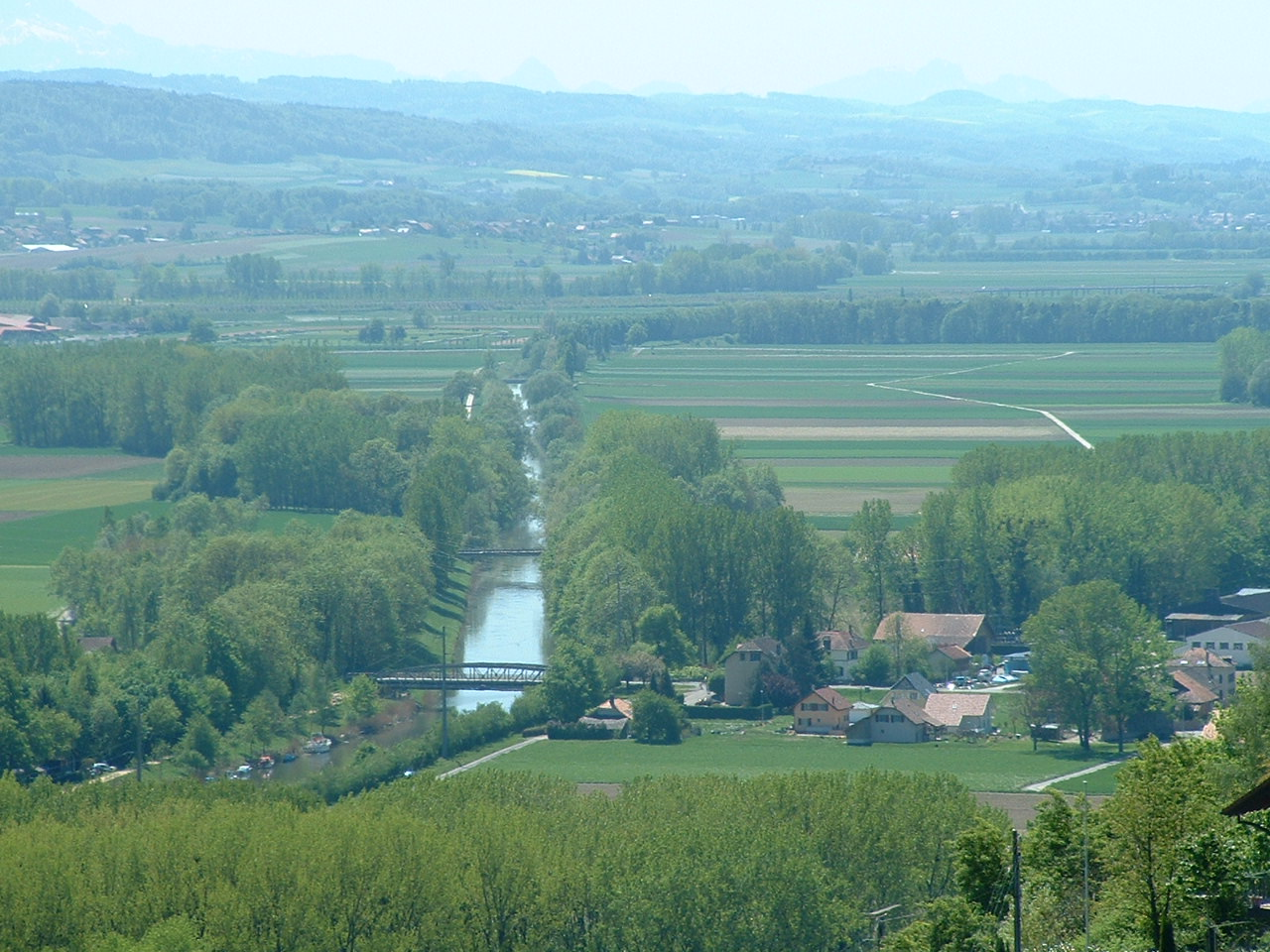
Broye village

Bellerive has a population (as of 2009) of 621. As of 2008, 9.9% of the population are resident foreign nationals. Over the last 10 years (1999–2009 ) the population has changed at a rate of 17.2%. It has changed at a rate of 21.3% due to migration and at a rate of -3.8% due to births and deaths.

Most of the population (as of 2000) speaks French (354 or 67.0%), with German being second most common (149 or 28.2%) and Portuguese being third (14 or 2.7%). There are 2 people who speak Italian.

Of the population in the municipality 141 or about 26.7% were born in Bellerive and lived there in 2000. There were 89 or 16.9% who were born in the same canton, while 224 or 42.4% were born somewhere else in Switzerland, and 59 or 11.2% were born outside of Switzerland.

In 2008 there were 4 live births to Swiss citizens and 2 births to non-Swiss citizens, and in same time span there were 8 deaths of Swiss citizens. Ignoring immigration and emigration, the population of Swiss citizens decreased by 4 while the foreign population increased by 2. There were 4 Swiss men and 3 Swiss women who emigrated from Switzerland. At the same time, there were 2 non-Swiss men and 4 non-Swiss women who immigrated from another country to Switzerland. The total Swiss population change in 2008 (from all sources, including moves across municipal borders) was a decrease of 2 and the non-Swiss population increased by 11 people. This represents a population growth rate of 1.5%.

The age distribution, as of 2009, in Bellerive is; 53 children or 8.5% of the population are between 0 and 9 years old and 52 teenagers or 8.4% are between 10 and 19. Of the adult population, 54 people or 8.7% of the population are between 20 and 29 years old. 73 people or 11.8% are between 30 and 39, 115 people or 18.5% are between 40 and 49, and 81 people or 13.0% are between 50 and 59. The senior population distribution is 110 people or 17.7% of the population are between 60 and 69 years old, 49 people or 7.9% are between 70 and 79, there are 26 people or 4.2% who are 80 and 89, and there are 8 people or 1.3% who are 90 and older.

As of 2000, there were 199 people who were single and never married in the municipality. There were 237 married individuals, 49 widows or widowers and 43 individuals who are divorced.

As of 2000 the average number of residents per living room was 0.5 which is fewer people per room than the cantonal average of 0.61 per room. In this case, a room is defined as space of a housing unit of at least 4 m^{2} (43 sq ft) as normal bedrooms, dining rooms, living rooms, kitchens and habitable cellars and attics. About 60.2% of the total households were owner occupied, or in other words did not pay rent (though they may have a mortgage or a rent-to-own agreement).

As of 2000, there were 241 private households in the municipality, and an average of 1.9 persons per household. There were 115 households that consist of only one person and 12 households with five or more people. Out of a total of 252 households that answered this question, 45.6% were households made up of just one person and there were 2 adults who lived with their parents. Of the rest of the households, there are 64 married couples without children, 38 married couples with children There were 12 single parents with a child or children. There were 10 households that were made up of unrelated people and 11 households that were made up of some sort of institution or another collective housing.

In 2000 there were 257 single family homes (or 71.0% of the total) out of a total of 362 inhabited buildings. There were 43 multi-family buildings (11.9%), along with 36 multi-purpose buildings that were mostly used for housing (9.9%) and 26 other use buildings (commercial or industrial) that also had some housing (7.2%). Of the single family homes 20 were built before 1919, while 8 were built between 1990 and 2000. The greatest number of single family homes (105) were built between 1961 and 1970. The most multi-family homes (11) were built before 1919 and the next most (9) were built between 1981 and 1990. There was 1 multi-family house built between 1996 and 2000.

In 2000 there were 458 apartments in the municipality. The most common apartment size was 3 rooms of which there were 182. There were 13 single room apartments and 94 apartments with five or more rooms. Of these apartments, a total of 191 apartments (41.7% of the total) were permanently occupied, while 237 apartments (51.7%) were seasonally occupied and 30 apartments (6.6%) were empty. As of 2009, the construction rate of new housing units was 14.5 new units per 1000 residents. The vacancy rate for the municipality, in 2010, was 0.2%.

The historical population is given in the following chart:

== Sights ==
The entire hamlets of Cotterd and Vallamand-Dessous are designated as part of the Inventory of Swiss Heritage Sites.

== Politics ==
In the 2007 federal election the most popular party was the SVP which received 27.33% of the vote. The next three most popular parties were the FDP (26.51%), the SP (16.52%) and the Green Party (13%). In the federal election, a total of 193 votes were cast, and the voter turnout was 42.7%.

== Economy ==
As of 2010, Bellerive had an unemployment rate of 2.2%. As of 2008, there were 30 people employed in the primary economic sector and about 8 businesses involved in this sector. 3 people were employed in the secondary sector and there were 3 businesses in this sector. 155 people were employed in the tertiary sector, with 24 businesses in this sector. There were 268 residents of the municipality who were employed in some capacity, of which females made up 44.4% of the workforce.

In 2008 the total number of full-time equivalent jobs was 140. The number of jobs in the primary sector was 22, all of which were in agriculture. The number of jobs in the secondary sector was 3 of which 2 or (66.7%) were in manufacturing and 1 was in construction. The number of jobs in the tertiary sector was 115. In the tertiary sector; 34 or 29.6% were in the sale or repair of motor vehicles, 14 or 12.2% were in the movement and storage of goods, 14 or 12.2% were in a hotel or restaurant, 1 was in the information industry, 1 was the insurance or financial industry, 4 or 3.5% were in education and 44 or 38.3% were in health care.

In 2000, there were 108 workers who commuted into the municipality and 179 workers who commuted away. The municipality is a net exporter of workers, with about 1.7 workers leaving the municipality for every one entering. Of the working population, 5.6% used public transportation to get to work, and 68.7% used a private car.

== Religion ==
From the 2000 census, 110 or 20.8% were Roman Catholic, while 335 or 63.4% belonged to the Swiss Reformed Church. Of the rest of the population, there were 4 members of an Orthodox church (or about 0.76% of the population), there was 1 individual who belongs to the Christian Catholic Church, and there were 8 individuals (or about 1.52% of the population) who belonged to another Christian church. There were 4 (or about 0.76% of the population) who were Islamic. There were 3 individuals who were Buddhist and 1 individual who belonged to another church. 55 (or about 10.42% of the population) belonged to no church, are agnostic or atheist, and 7 individuals (or about 1.33% of the population) did not answer the question.

== Education ==
In Bellerive about 211 or (40.0%) of the population have completed non-mandatory upper secondary education, and 77 or (14.6%) have completed additional higher education (either University or a Fachhochschule). Of the 77 who completed tertiary schooling, 61.0% were Swiss men, 29.9% were Swiss women, 6.5% were non-Swiss men.

In the 2009/2010 school year there were a total of 48 students in the Bellerive school district. In the Vaud cantonal school system, two years of non-obligatory pre-school are provided by the political districts. During the school year, the political district provided pre-school care for a total of 155 children of which 83 children (53.5%) received subsidized pre-school care. The canton's primary school program requires students to attend for four years. There were 29 students in the municipal primary school program. The obligatory lower secondary school program lasts for six years and there were 19 students in those schools.

As of 2000, there were 42 students in Bellerive who came from another municipality, while 53 residents attended schools outside the municipality.

== Notable people ==
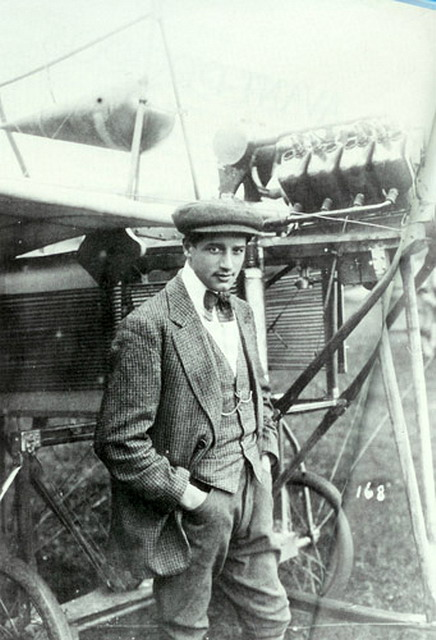
René Grandjean

- René Grandjean, Swiss aviation pioneer
