= Guévaux Castle =

Castle in Vully-les-Lacs, Vaud, Switzerland

- Château de Guévaux
- Vully-les-Lacs in Switzerland
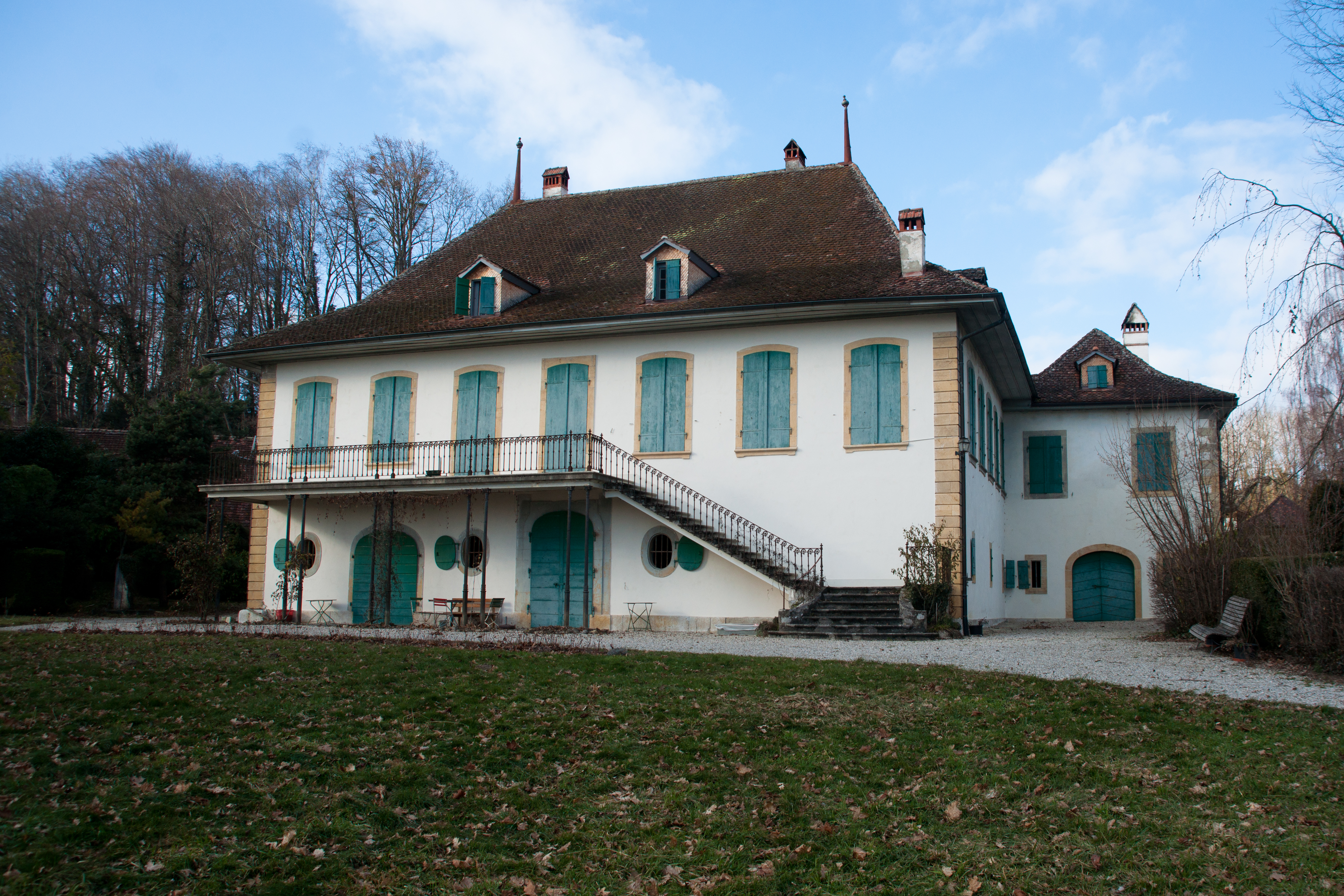
- View of the Château

Site information
- Type: Château

Location
- Coordinates: 46°56′17″N 7°03′23″E

Swiss Cultural Property of National Significance

Guévaux Castle is a castle in the municipality of Vully-les-Lacs of the Canton of Vaud in Switzerland. It is a Swiss heritage site of national significance.

== See also ==
- List of castles in Switzerland
- Château
