= Cudrefin =

- Municipality
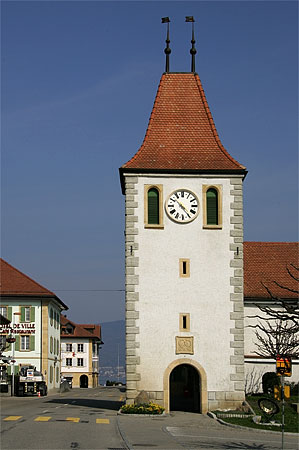
- Cudrefin village clock tower

- Flag Coat of arms
- Location of Cudrefin
- Location within Switzerland Location within Canton of Vaud
- Coordinates: 46°57′N 07°01′E
- Country: Switzerland
- Canton: Vaud
- District: Broye-Vully

Government
  - Mayor: Syndic; Claude Roulin

Area
  - Total: 15.82 km^{2} (6.11 sq mi)
- Elevation: 434 m (1,424 ft)

Population (2003)
  - Total: 923
  - Density: 58.3/km^{2} (151/sq mi)
- Demonym: Les Cudrefinois
- Time zone: UTC+01:00 (CET)
  - Summer (DST): UTC+02:00 (CEST)
- Postal code: 1588
- SFOS number: 5456
- ISO 3166 code: CH-VD
- Surrounded by: Mont-Vully (FR), Vully-les-Lacs
- Website: www.cudrefin.ch

Cudrefin (French pronunciation: [kydʁəfɛ̃]) is a municipality in the district of Broye-Vully in the canton of Vaud in Switzerland.

== History ==
Cudrefin is first mentioned in 999 as Curtefin.

== Geography ==
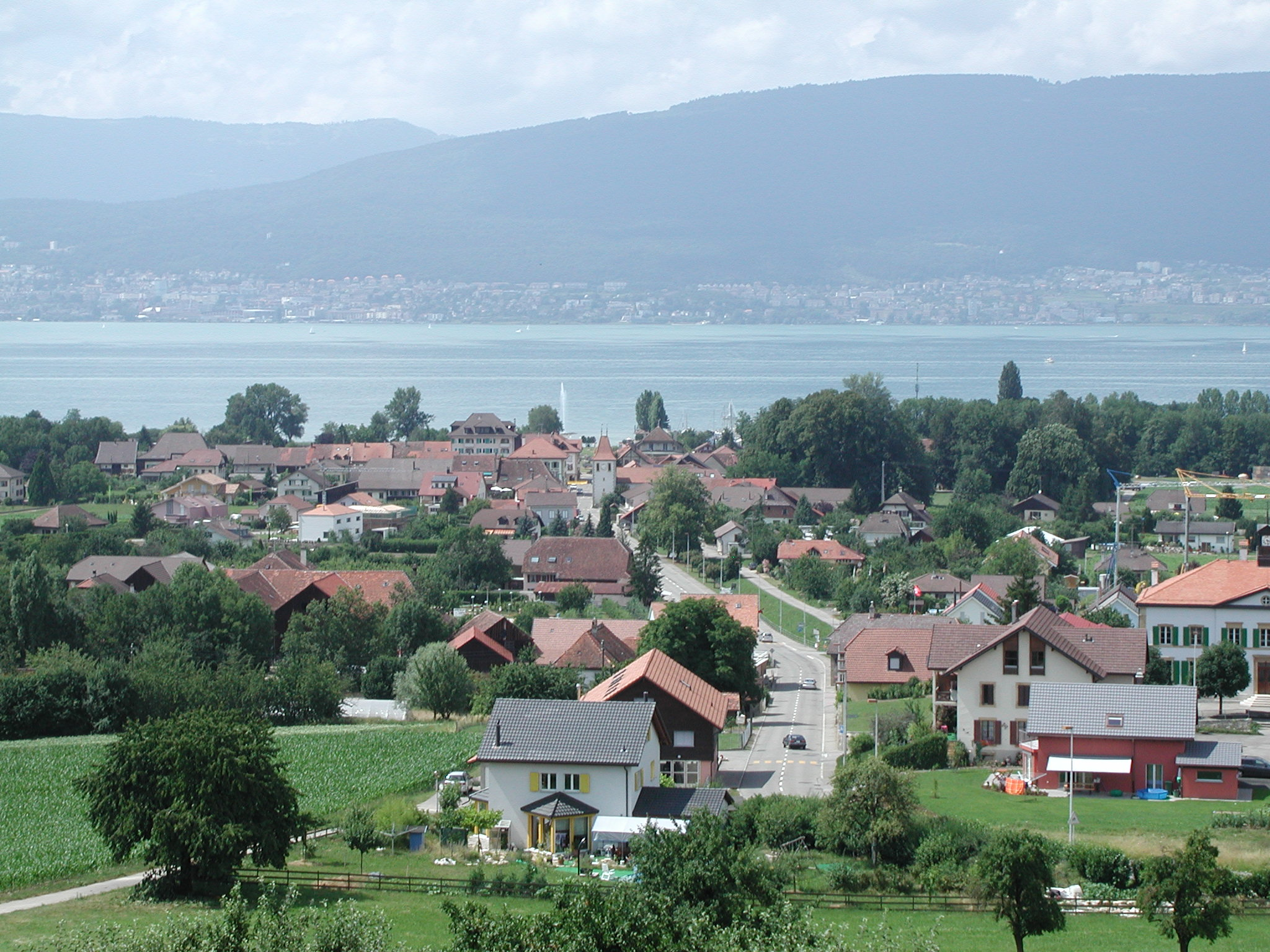
Cudrefin

Cudrefin has an area, as of 2009, of 15.82 square kilometers (6.11 sq mi). Of this area, 9.61 km^{2} (3.71 sq mi) or 60.7% is used for agricultural purposes, while 3.6 km^{2} (1.4 sq mi) or 22.8% is forested. Of the rest of the land, 1.27 km^{2} (0.49 sq mi) or 8.0% is settled (buildings or roads), 0.08 km^{2} (20 acres) or 0.5% is either rivers or lakes and 1.3 km^{2} (0.50 sq mi) or 8.2% is unproductive land.

Of the built up area, housing and buildings made up 3.8% and transportation infrastructure made up 2.7%. while parks, green belts and sports fields made up 1.5%. Out of the forested land, all of the forested land area is covered with heavy forests. Of the agricultural land, 52.8% is used for growing crops and 6.0% is pastures, while 1.9% is used for orchards or vine crops. All the water in the municipality is flowing water.

The municipality was part of the Avenches District until it was dissolved on 31 August 2006, and Cudrefin became part of the new district of Broye-Vully.

On 1 January 2002 the former municipality of Champmartin merged into the municipality of Cudrefin, keeping the name Cudrefin.

The municipality is located along Lake Neuchâtel. It consists of the village of Cudrefin, the hamlet of Montet and since 2002, the village of Champmartin.

== Coat of arms ==
The blazon of the municipal coat of arms is Per fess chief per pale Gules and Argent overall a Trout nainaint Azure and Or a Crayfish Gules. The new coat of arms includes the symbols of both Cudrefin (trout) and the former municipality of Champmartin (crayfish).

== Demographics ==
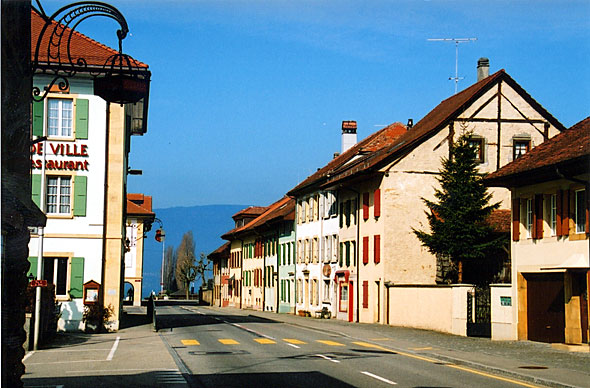
Main street in Cudrefin

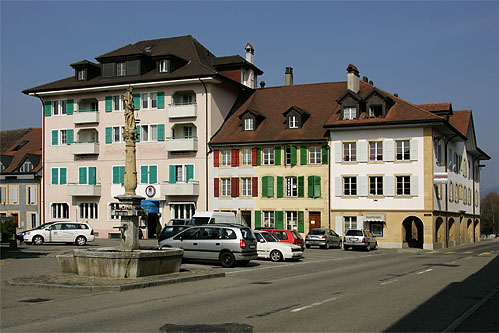
Village center with Fountain of Justice

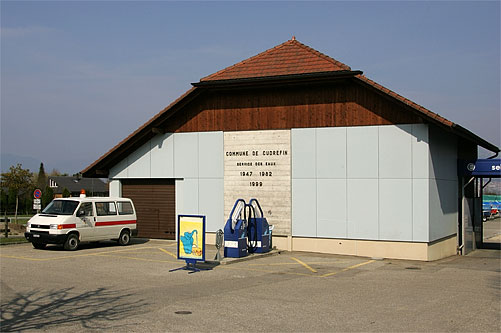
Water service station in Cudrefin

Cudrefin has a population (as of December 2020) of 1,780. As of 2008, 10.6% of the population are resident foreign nationals. Over the last 10 years (1999–2009) the population has changed at a rate of 42.6%. It has changed at a rate of 36.6% due to migration and at a rate of 6.8% due to births and deaths.

Most of the population (as of 2000) speaks French (638 or 75.6%), with German being second most common (170 or 20.1%) and Portuguese being third (14 or 1.7%). There are 9 people who speak Italian and 1 person who speaks Romansh.

Of the population in the municipality 250 or about 29.6% were born in Cudrefin and lived there in 2000. There were 98 or 11.6% who were born in the same canton, while 364 or 43.1% were born somewhere else in Switzerland, and 101 or 12.0% were born outside of Switzerland.

In 2008 there were 12 live births to Swiss citizens and 1 birth to non-Swiss citizens, and in same time span there were 6 deaths of Swiss citizens and 1 non-Swiss citizen death. Ignoring immigration and emigration, the population of Swiss citizens increased by 6 while the foreign population remained the same. There was 1 non-Swiss man and 4 non-Swiss women who immigrated from another country to Switzerland. The total Swiss population change in 2008 (from all sources, including moves across municipal borders) was an increase of 18 and the non-Swiss population increased by 19 people. This represents a population growth rate of 3.5%.

The age distribution, as of 2009, in Cudrefin is; 173 children or 14.5% of the population are between 0 and 9 years old and 129 teenagers or 10.8% are between 10 and 19. Of the adult population, 99 people or 8.3% of the population are between 20 and 29 years old. 191 people or 16.0% are between 30 and 39, 193 people or 16.1% are between 40 and 49, and 161 people or 13.5% are between 50 and 59. The senior population distribution is 123 people or 10.3% of the population are between 60 and 69 years old, 79 people or 6.6% are between 70 and 79, there are 46 people or 3.8% who are between 80 and 89, and there are 3 people or 0.3% who are 90 and older.

As of 2000, there were 324 people who were single and never married in the municipality. There were 425 married individuals, 39 widows or widowers and 56 individuals who are divorced.

As of 2000, there were 381 private households in the municipality, and an average of 2.2 persons per household. There were 117 households that consist of only one person and 18 households with five or more people. Out of a total of 375 households that answered this question, 31.2% were households made up of just one person and there were 2 adults who lived with their parents. Of the rest of the households, there are 120 married couples without children, 109 married couples with children There were 16 single parents with a child or children. There were 4 households that were made up of unrelated people and 7 households that were made up of some sort of institution or another collective housing.

In 2000 there were 338 single family homes (or 72.4% of the total) out of a total of 467 inhabited buildings. There were 40 multi-family buildings (8.6%), along with 69 multi-purpose buildings that were mostly used for housing (14.8%) and 20 other use buildings (commercial or industrial) that also had some housing (4.3%). Of the single family homes 48 were built before 1919, while 22 were built between 1990 and 2000. The greatest number of single family homes (87) were built between 1961 and 1970. The greatest number of multi-family homes (8) were built before 1919 and again between 1919 and 1945. There were 2 multi-family houses built between 1996 and 2000.

In 2000 there were 591 apartments in the municipality. The most common apartment size was 4 rooms of which there were 171. There were 27 single room apartments and 186 apartments with five or more rooms. Of these apartments, a total of 351 apartments (59.4% of the total) were permanently occupied, while 199 apartments (33.7%) were seasonally occupied and 41 apartments (6.9%) were empty. As of 2009, the construction rate of new housing units was 23.4 new units per 1000 residents. The vacancy rate for the municipality, in 2010, was 0.84%.

The historical population is given in the following chart:

== Heritage sites of national significance ==
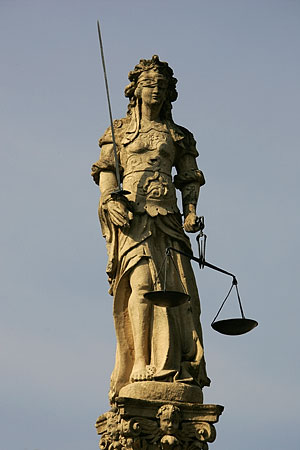
Fountain of Justice

The Fountain of Justice is listed as a Swiss heritage site of national significance. The entire village of Montet is part of the Inventory of Swiss Heritage Sites.

== Politics ==
In the 2007 federal election the most popular party was the SVP which received 31.32% of the vote. The next three most popular parties were the SP (19.93%), the FDP (14.09%) and the Green Party (12.51%). In the federal election, a total of 270 votes were cast, and the voter turnout was 37.8%.

== Economy ==
As of 2010, Cudrefin had an unemployment rate of 2.9%. As of 2008, there were 78 people employed in the primary economic sector and about 27 businesses involved in this sector. 38 people were employed in the secondary sector and there were 10 businesses in this sector. 140 people were employed in the tertiary sector, with 40 businesses in this sector. There were 450 residents of the municipality who were employed in some capacity, of which females made up 42.2% of the workforce.

In 2008 the total number of full-time equivalent jobs was 188. The number of jobs in the primary sector was 50, of which 48 were in agriculture, 1 was in forestry or lumber production and 1 was in fishing or fisheries. The number of jobs in the secondary sector was 36 of which 10 or (27.8%) were in manufacturing and 25 (69.4%) were in construction. The number of jobs in the tertiary sector was 102. In the tertiary sector; 25 or 24.5% were in wholesale or retail sales or the repair of motor vehicles, 4 or 3.9% were in the movement and storage of goods, 30 or 29.4% were in a hotel or restaurant, 3 or 2.9% were in the information industry, 2 or 2.0% were technical professionals or scientists, 4 or 3.9% were in education.

In 2000, there were 64 workers who commuted into the municipality and 278 workers who commuted away. The municipality is a net exporter of workers, with about 4.3 workers leaving the municipality for every one entering. Of the working population, 5.6% used public transportation to get to work, and 62.8% used a private car.

== Religion ==
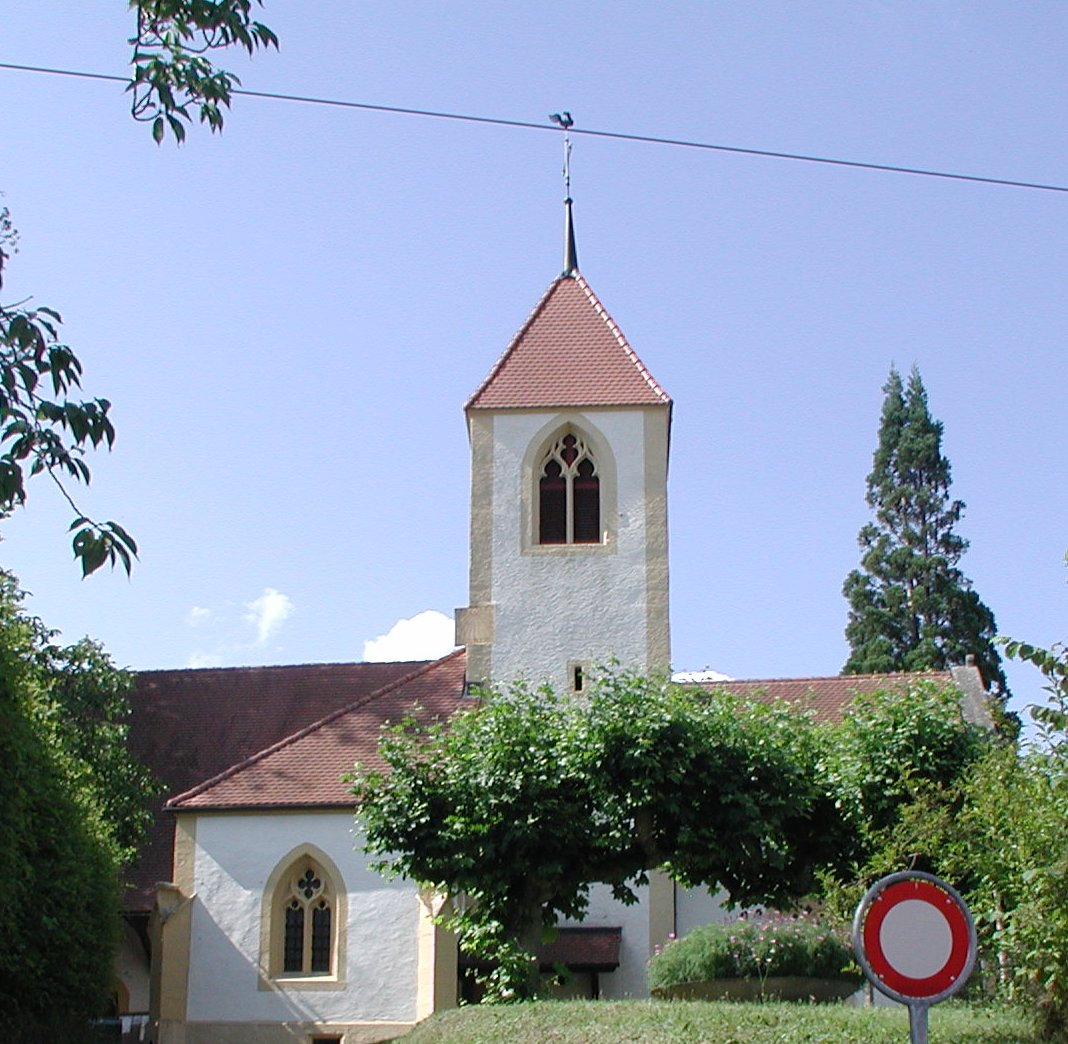
The church of Montet-Cudrefin

From the 2000 census, 182 or 21.6% were Roman Catholic, while 482 or 57.1% belonged to the Swiss Reformed Church. Of the rest of the population, there was 1 member of an Orthodox church who belonged, and there were 12 individuals (or about 1.42% of the population) who belonged to another Christian church. 120 (or about 14.22% of the population) belonged to no church, are agnostic or atheist, and 46 individuals (or about 5.45% of the population) did not answer the question.

== Education ==
In Cudrefin about 306 or (36.3%) of the population have completed non-mandatory upper secondary education, and 128 or (15.2%) have completed additional higher education (either university or a Fachhochschule). Of the 128 who completed tertiary schooling, 60.9% were Swiss men, 25.8% were Swiss women, 9.4% were non-Swiss men and 3.9% were non-Swiss women.

In the 2009/2010 school year there were a total of 155 students in the Cudrefin school district. In the Vaud cantonal school system, two years of non-obligatory pre-school are provided by the political districts. During the school year, the political district provided pre-school care for a total of 155 children of which 83 children (53.5%) received subsidized pre-school care. The canton's primary school program requires students to attend for four years. There were 91 students in the municipal primary school program. The obligatory lower secondary school program lasts for six years and there were 62 students in those schools. There were also 2 students who were home schooled or attended another non-traditional school.

As of 2000, there were 13 students in Cudrefin who came from another municipality, while 85 residents attended schools outside the municipality.
