= Church of San Giovanni Battista, Mogno =

Coordinates: 46°25′50″N 8°39′48″E

Church of San Giovanni Battista
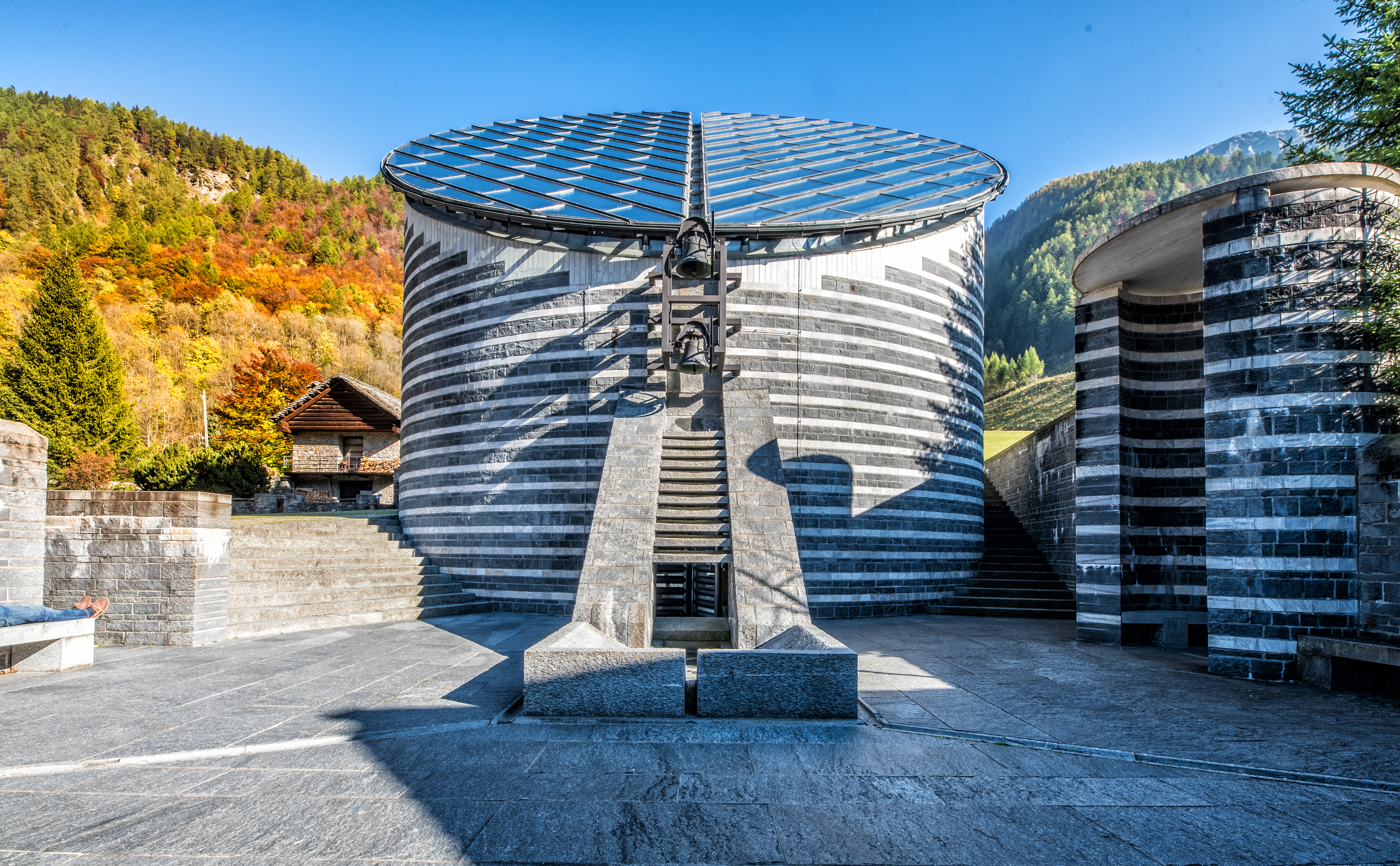
- Church of San Giovanni Battista, Mogno
- Church of San Giovanni Battista
- Location: Mogno, Lavizzara
- Country: Switzerland
- Denomination: Catholic

Architecture
- Architect: Mario Botta
- Style: Postmodern

Administration
- Diocese: Lugano

The Church of San Giovanni Battista (Italian: Chiesa di San Giovanni Battista; German: Kirche San Giovanni Battista) is located in the alpine village of Mogno in the Swiss canton of Ticino. It was built between 1994 and 1996 on the site of an older church (from 1636), which was levelled by an avalanche in 1986. The church is named after St John the Baptist.

The new church was designed by the Swiss architect Mario Botta who used marble and granite from the valleys of the area.

== Description ==
The church has a structure with an elliptical plan, with an inclined circular glass surface that serves as a roof. It is enjoined by two outdoor spaces, a recessed seating area on its west side, and a small plaza on its north. With respect to a longitudinal plane it can be noted that the most significant element is the rampant arch, which, according to the will of the designer, symbolizes the arch of the ancient church that protected part of the village of Mogno from the avalanche of April 25, 1986 that completely overwhelmed and destroyed the old church. The two bells, dated back to 1746, are the only elements recovered after the avalanche. The interior set-up is very simple: it consists exclusively of two rows of wooden benches arranged in axis with respect to the altar: the altar, of white marble, consists exclusively of two blocks. On the left side there is a statue of the Madonna, that stands over a baptismal font in light marble. The construction materials are: the gneiss (such as Beola) coming from Riveo quarries, the white marble of Peccia valley, iron for the supporting structure of the roof, and glass for the roof.
