= Lavizzara =

- Municipality
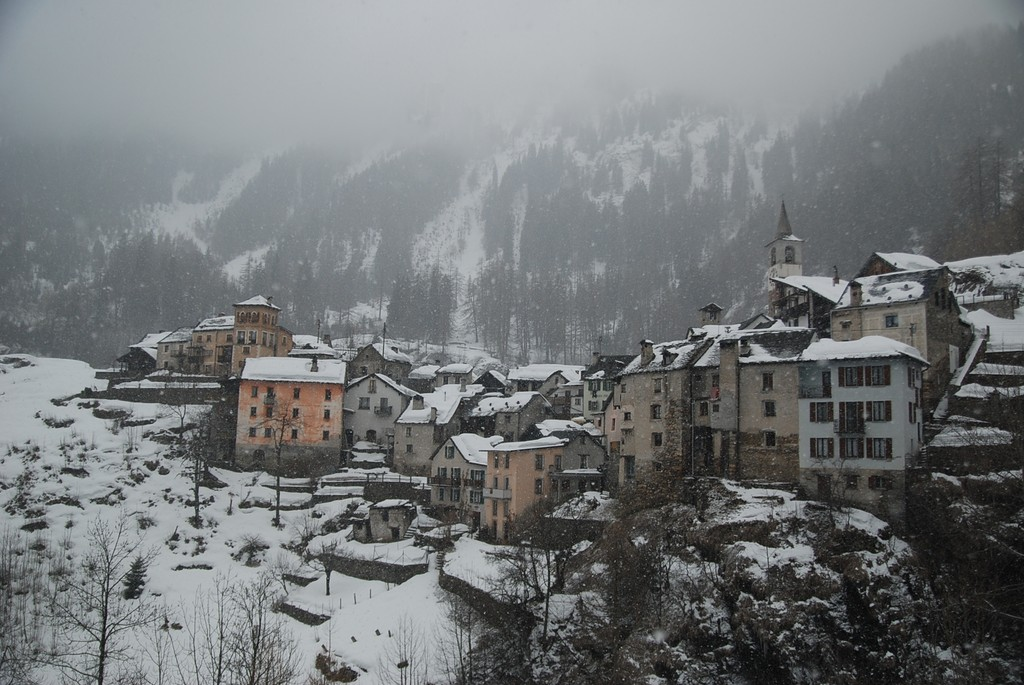
- Fusio village

- Flag Coat of arms
- Location of Lavizzara
- Location within Switzerland Location within Canton of Ticino
- Coordinates: 46°26′N 8°39′E
- Country: Switzerland
- Canton: Ticino
- District: Vallemaggia

Government
  - Mayor: Sindaco

Area
  - Total: 187.5 km^{2} (72.4 sq mi)
- Elevation: 763 m (2,503 ft)

Population (December 2004)
  - Total: 579
  - Density: 3.09/km^{2} (8.00/sq mi)
- Time zone: UTC+01:00 (CET)
  - Summer (DST): UTC+02:00 (CEST)
- Postal code: 6692-6696
- SFOS number: 5323
- ISO 3166 code: CH-TI
- Localities: Broglio, Brontallo, Fusio, Menzonio, Mogno, Monti di Rima, Peccia, Piano di Peccia, Prato, San Carlo, Sant'Antonio, Sornico
- Surrounded by: Airolo, Bedretto, Brione (Verzasca), Cevio, Chironico, Dalpe, Maggia, Prato Leventina, Quinto, Sonogno
- Website: www.lavizzara.ch

Lavizzara is a municipality in the district of Vallemaggia in the canton of Ticino in Switzerland. It is the only municipality in the valley (Valle Lavizzara).

The municipality was created in 2004 by a merger of Broglio, Brontallo, Fusio, Menzonio, Peccia and Prato-Sornico.

== History ==
Broglio is first mentioned in 1361 as Brono. Brontallo is first mentioned in 1574 as Bruntalo. Fusio is first mentioned in 1258 as Fuxio. Menzonio is first mentioned in 1364 as Menzone. Peccia is first mentioned in 1374 as Petia. Prato and Sornico were first mentioned in 1374.

=== Broglio ===
The existing village area has developed in several stages. It was created in 1374, when the valley (comunità) Lavizzara broke up and divided its lands. At the end of the 16th century, it grew again through a series of agreements between the neighboring communities.

The Church of S. Maria Lauretana was dedicated in 1487. In the following centuries, it was repeatedly rebuilt and restored. It belonged to the Sornico parish until 1616, when it became an independent parish. The historically significant building, Casa Pometta, is from the 17th century.

The highest population in the village was during the 17th century. The slow population decline intensified in the late 19th century with emigration to the cities and to other countries. In 1990, agriculture and livestock, which for centuries were the main sources of income, employed about a third of the workforce. In recent decades, the number of vacation homes has increased markedly.

=== Brontallo ===
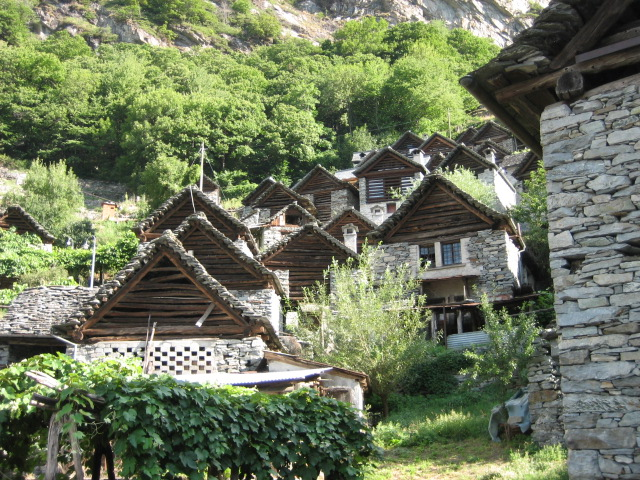
Brontallo.

Until the beginning of the 15th century, it formed a community with Menzonio and together with Bignasco and Cavergno it formed a Vicinanza.

The Church of S. Maria e S. Giorgio was first mentioned in the 15th century. In the 16th century it was rebuilt, and then renovated several times thereafter. Until 1513 it, along with Menzonio, was part of the parish of Cevio. In 1513 Menzonio broke away from Cevio, but Brontallo remained part of the parish until 1655.

The greatest population was during the 17th century. The population decline began in the 18th century, but accelerated into the 20th century. The road running from the village into the Val Lavizzara was completed in 1955. In 1990 less than a third of the workforce was employed in agriculture. Many of the homes in the village are now vacation homes.

=== Fusio ===
The population reached its peak in the 16th–17th century (400–500 inhabitants), but towards the end of the 18th century began a slow decline. This slow decline accelerated dramatically after 1950 because of emigration to the cities. Most of the remaining population is elderly.

The church, consecrated in 1455 to the Beata Vergine Assunta, was a Chapel of ease of Sornico until the 16th century. It was later rebuilt several times, mainly in the 17th century.

The local economy relied on livestock, pastures and forestry. The village possessed vast pastures and alpine pastures, which explains the relatively small number of emigrants overseas. Until the second half of the 19th century, there were two mines in the village that produced steatite (soapstone). Through the construction of the dam in the Sambuco valley (1950–56) the amount of agricultural land has been reduced. From the 1980s a number of houses and an inn were built.

The hamlet of Mogno was also part of the village. In the 17th century it possessed 50 taxable fireplaces. By 1801, the population had dropped to just 40 inhabitants. Today it is no longer inhabited all year round and serves only as a holiday village. Before Mogno was incorporated in 1936 into Fusio it was part of Peccia, and the land around the settlement was shared between Fusio, Peccia, Prato and Sornica.

The church of San Giovanni Battista Decollato was built in 1626 and was initially a chapel of ease of the parish of Peccia. Towards the end of the 17th century, it became an independent parish church. In 1940 it became part of the parish of Fusio. The church was destroyed in 1986 by an avalanche. The new building, by Mario Botta, was built in 1997 after 10 years of planning and construction work. The unique construction of the building has already become a point of interest and a source of critical debate.

=== Menzonio ===
Until the beginning of the 15th century, Menzonio and Brontallo formed a single municipality, and together with Bignasco and Cavergno it formed a Vicinanza which was under the jurisdiction of the Lavizzara valley. At the time of the Swiss Confederation rule over Ticino, Menzonio was one of seven villages in the valley.

The village church was part of the parish of Cevio until 1513 when it split away to form a parish with Brontallo. In 1655, this parish was dissolved and Menzonio formed its own parish. The Church of SS Giacomo e Filippo was first mentioned in the 15th century. The current building was built in 1585 and was rebuilt in 1644 and finally in 1905.

In the 17th century, the population reached its peak and then decreased gradually, initially because of emigration to Italy. Later the residents emigrated to California and finally they moved away from the villages to the cities of Ticino and the rest of Switzerland.

For centuries the local economy was dominated by grazing and agriculture. In the 19th century there was a soapstone quarry and four mills. The road that connects Menzonio with the valley floor, was built in 1949. In 2000, three-quarters of the workforce were commuters.

=== Peccia ===
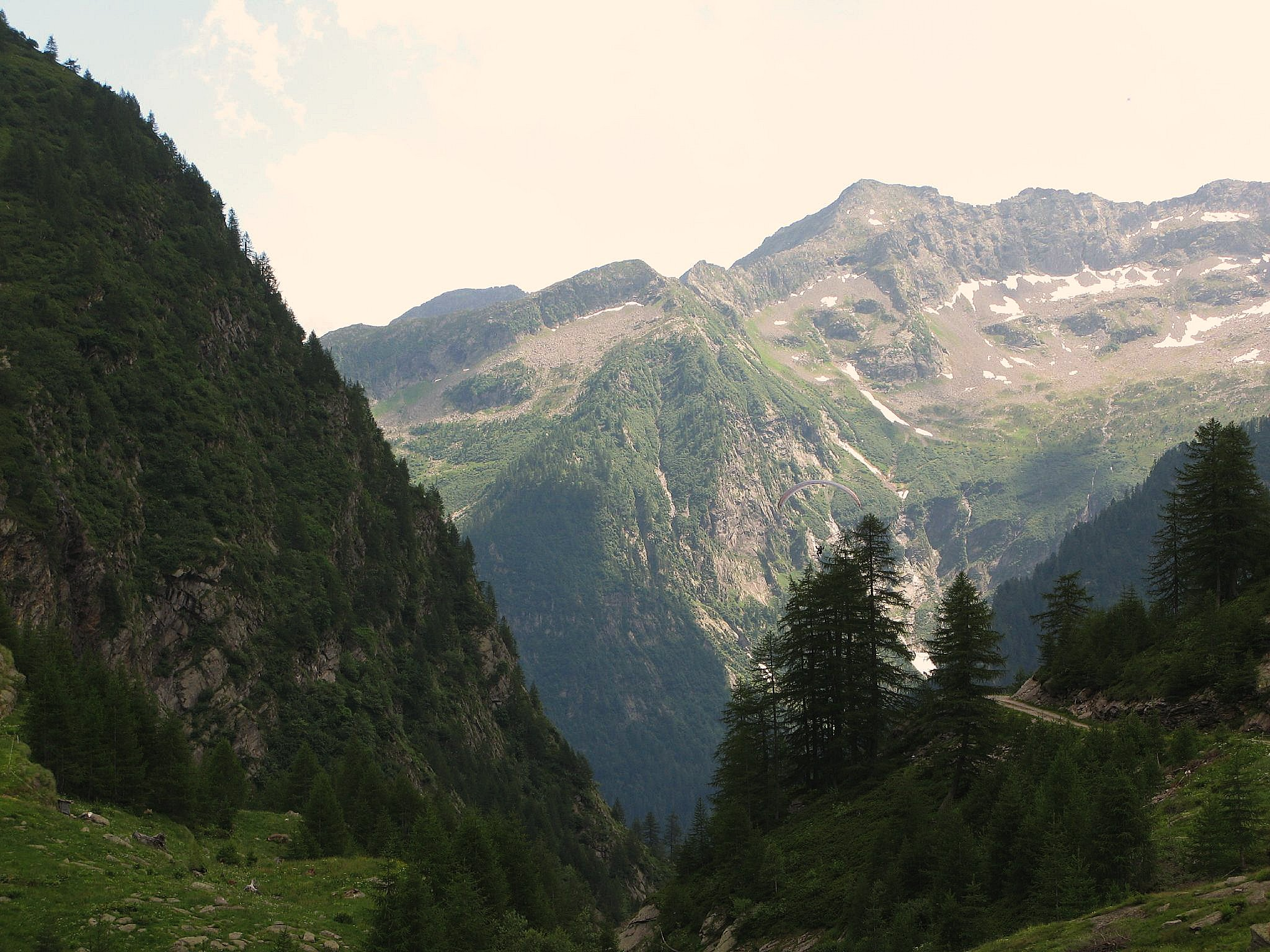
Peccia valley

Peccia, together with Broglio, Fusio, Prato and Sornico were part of the comunità or valley community of Lavizzara until 1374. When the valley community broke up into separate villages, Peccia was the largest in the Lavizzara region. It included the settlement of Mogno and the Valle di Peccia, which was independent until 1669. The common, shared land of the four communities of Fusio, Peccia, Prato and Sornico (known as the comunella dei quattro comuni) remained shared until 1929.

The village was part of the parish of Sornico until 1613, after which the church of S. Antonio Abate in Peccia was elevated to become a parish church. The church was built in the 16th century. After the floods of 1834 and 1868, which destroyed some of the village, the church was totally rebuilt. The valley church of S. Carlo was built in 1617, and was raised to be the parish church in 1669.

At the beginning of the 20th century, most of the jobs in the village were in the extraction, processing (vessels and stone ovens) and trade in soapstone. Since 1946, white marble is also mined, which is the only marble quarry in Switzerland. In 1984, the presence of marble led to the creation of a sculpting school. This marble was used when the church of Mogno (a hamlet of Fusio) was rebuilt by Mario Botta, after the old church was destroyed by an avalanche in 1986.

At the beginning of the 21st century, manufacturing provides more than a third of the jobs in village. In 1950-56 largest hydroelectric power plants in Switzerland was built in the Valle di Peccia. It is fed by water from the catchment area of the Maggia river. In the last decades of the 20th century, the village invested in its tourist infrastructure.

=== Prato-Sornico ===
Prato and Sornico, along with Broglio, Fusio and Peccia, formed the valley community of Lavizzara. In 1374, the community dissolved and the villages of Prato and Sornico became independent. The common, shared land of the four communities of Fusio, Peccia, Prato and Sornico (known as the comunella dei quattro comuni) remained shared until 1929. In the 15th century, the hamlet was the seat of the General Council of the valley, then the seat of the Swiss Confederation governor between 1513 and 1798. After 1803 it was the capital of the sub-district of Lavizzara. Even today stately houses in the village testify of its political and religious importance of the village. One of the houses in the village, which was built in the 15th century, extended in the 16th century and renovated in 1975–77, served as the seat of the bailiff and a prison. Another house, in Prato, is Casa Berna, which is from the 18th century. It contains the rich library of Giulio Giovanni Gerolamo Berna, the archpriest of Locarno.

The church of San Martino in Sornico is first mentioned in the 14th century, but probably dates back to the 11th century. It was the mother church in the 16th century of the Val Lavizzara and in 1747 became a provost's church. The parish church of SS Fabiano e Sebastiano in Prato was built in 1487, rebuilt in 1730 and re-consecrated in 1761 by the Bishop of Como.

In the 19th and 20th century, the emigration overseas and into the cities led to a sharp population decline. In this alpine village at the beginning of the 21st century, one-third of the workforce still works in agriculture. In the last decades of the 20th century, many vacation homes and tourist infrastructure were built in the village.

== Geography ==
Aerial view (1954)

Lavizzara has an area, as of 1997, of 187.5 square kilometers (72.4 sq mi). Of this area, 1.79 km^{2} (0.69 sq mi) or 1.0% is used for agricultural purposes, while 56.66 km^{2} (21.88 sq mi) or 30.2% is forested. Of the rest of the land, 1.28 km^{2} (0.49 sq mi) or 0.7% is settled (buildings or roads), 4.38 km^{2} (1.69 sq mi) or 2.3% is either rivers or lakes and 96.66 km^{2} (37.32 sq mi) or 51.6% is unproductive land.

Of the built up area, housing and buildings made up 0.2% and transportation infrastructure made up 0.3%. Out of the forested land, 20.5% of the total land area is heavily forested and 4.7% is covered with orchards or small clusters of trees. Of the agricultural land, 0.7% is used for growing crops. Of the water in the municipality, 1.2% is in lakes and 1.1% is in rivers and streams. Of the unproductive areas, 22.6% is unproductive vegetation and 28.9% is too rocky for vegetation.

== Demographics ==
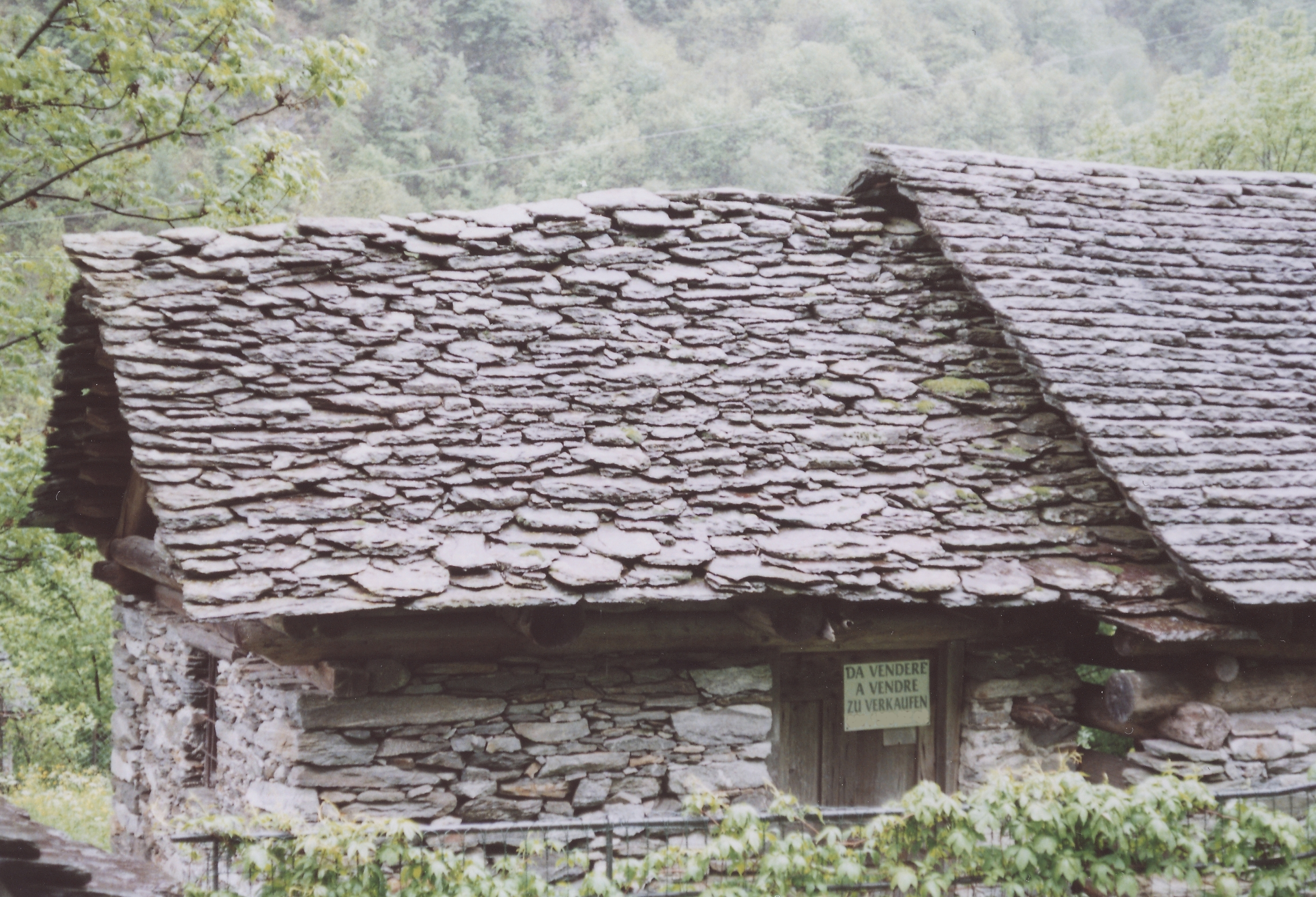
Dry stone house in Val Lavizzara

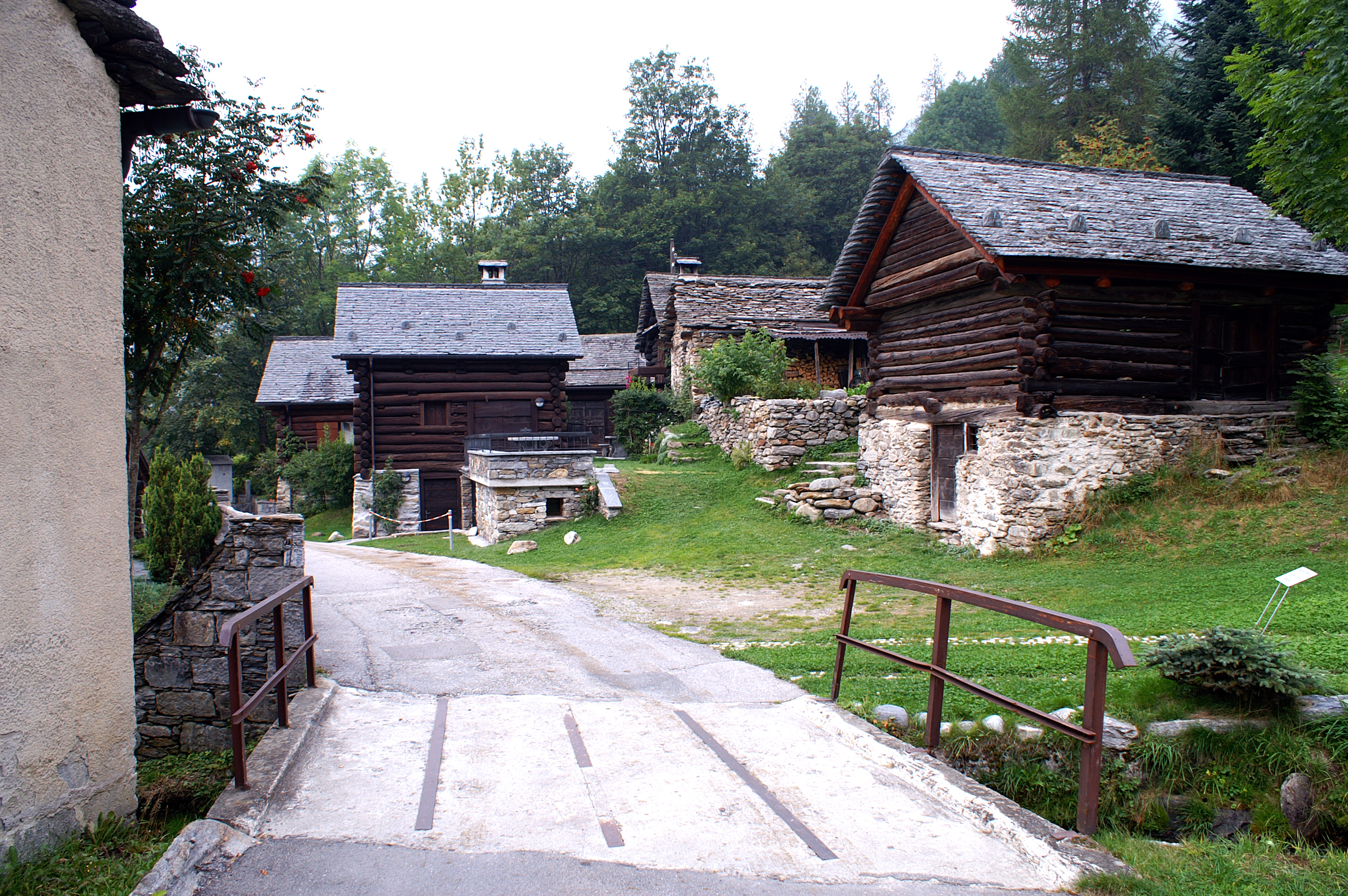
Mogno village

Lavizzara has a population (as of December 2020) of 500, all Swiss citizens. Over the last 10 years (1997–2007) the population has changed at a rate of 0%.

As of 2008, the gender distribution of the population was 50.4% male and 49.6% female. The population was made up of 264 Swiss men (46.1% of the population), and 25 (4.4%) non-Swiss men. There were 279 Swiss women (48.7%), and 5 (0.9%) non-Swiss women.

In 2008 there were 3 live births to Swiss citizens and 5 deaths of Swiss citizens. Ignoring immigration and emigration, the population of Swiss citizens decreased by 2 while the foreign population remained the same. There were 3 non-Swiss men and 1 non-Swiss woman who immigrated from another country to Switzerland. The total Swiss population change in 2008 (from all sources, including moves across municipal borders) was a decrease of 11 and the non-Swiss population change was an increase of 5 people. This represents a population growth rate of -1.0%.

The age distribution, as of 2009, in Lavizzara is; 52 children or 9.1% of the population are between 0 and 9 years old and 65 teenagers or 11.3% are between 10 and 19. Of the adult population, 56 people or 9.8% of the population are between 20 and 29 years old. 58 people or 10.1% are between 30 and 39, 83 people or 14.5% are between 40 and 49, and 73 people or 12.7% are between 50 and 59. The senior population distribution is 80 people or 14.0% of the population are between 60 and 69 years old, 55 people or 9.6% are between 70 and 79, there are 51 people or 8.9% who are over 80.

== Historic Population ==
The historical population is given in the following chart:

== Heritage sites of national significance ==
The A Mott D’Orei Settlement is listed as a Swiss heritage site of national significance. The villages of Broglio, Brontallo, Fusio, Prato, Sornico and Cortignelli are all part of the Inventory of Swiss Heritage Sites.

== Politics ==
In the 2007 federal election the most popular party was the CVP which received 40.28% of the vote. The next three most popular parties were the FDP (25.62%), the Ticino League (14.17%) and the SP (11.88%). In the federal election, a total of 212 votes were cast, and the voter turnout was 47.5%.

In the 2007 Gran Consiglio election, there were a total of 454 registered voters in Lavizzara, of which 331 or 72.9% voted. 4 blank ballots were cast, leaving 327 valid ballots in the election. The most popular party was the PPD+GenGiova which received 120 or 36.7% of the vote. The next three most popular parties were; the SSI (with 67 or 20.5%), the PLRT (with 45 or 13.8%) and the LEGA (with 38 or 11.6%).

In the 2007 Consiglio di Stato election, 2 blank ballots and 1 null ballot were cast, leaving 328 valid ballots in the election. The most popular party was the PPD which received 115 or 35.1% of the vote. The next three most popular parties were; the LEGA (with 77 or 23.5%), the SSI (with 43 or 13.1%) and the PLRT (with 40 or 12.2%).

== Economy ==
In 2008 the total number of full-time equivalent jobs was 161. The number of jobs in the primary sector was 33, all of which were in agriculture. The number of jobs in the secondary sector was 62, of which 7 or (11.3%) were in manufacturing, 10 or (16.1%) were in mining and 35 (56.5%) were in construction. The number of jobs in the tertiary sector was 66. In the tertiary sector; 2 or 3.0% were in wholesale or retail sales or the repair of motor vehicles, 28 or 42.4% were in the movement and storage of goods, 20 or 30.3% were in a hotel or restaurant, 1 or 1.5% were the insurance or financial industry, 2 or 3.0% were technical professionals or scientists, 6 or 9.1% were in education.

As of 2009, there were 4 hotels in Lavizzara with a total of 19 rooms and 35 beds.

== Education ==
In Lavizzara there were a total of 90 students (as of 2009). The Ticino education system provides up to three years of non-mandatory kindergarten and in Lavizzara there were 12 children in kindergarten. The primary school program lasts for five years. In the village, 23 students attended the standard primary schools. In the lower secondary school system, students either attend a two-year middle school followed by a two-year pre-apprenticeship or they attend a four-year program to prepare for higher education. There were 25 students in the two-year middle school, while 7 students were in the four-year advanced program.

The upper secondary school includes several options, but at the end of the upper secondary program, a student will be prepared to enter a trade or to continue on to a university or college. In Ticino, vocational students may either attend school while working on their internship or apprenticeship (which takes three or four years) or may attend school followed by an internship or apprenticeship (which takes one year as a full-time student or one and a half to two years as a part-time student). There were 6 vocational students who were attending school full-time and 16 who attend part-time.

The professional program lasts three years and prepares a student for a job in engineering, nursing, computer science, business, tourism and similar fields. There was 1 student in the professional program.
