= Brontallo =

- Former municipality
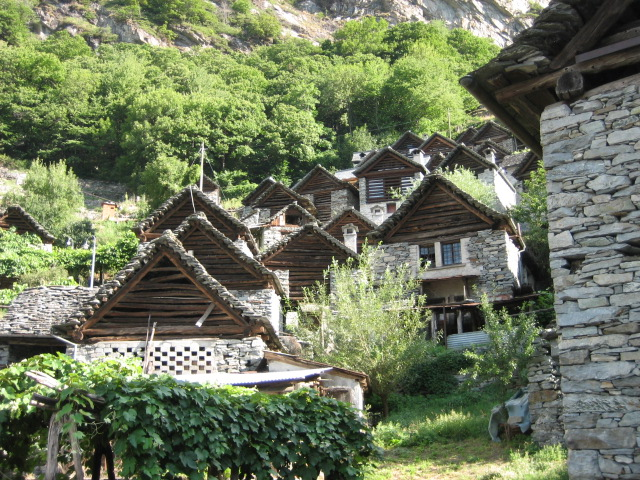

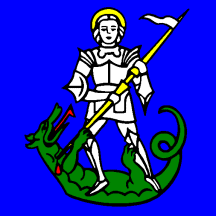
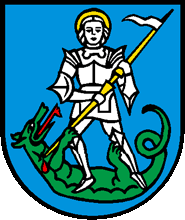
- Flag Coat of arms
- Location of Brontallo
- Location within Switzerland Location within Canton of Ticino
- Coordinates: 46°21′N 8°38′E
- Country: Switzerland
- Canton: Ticino
- District: Vallemaggia

Area
  - Total: 10.48 km^{2} (4.05 sq mi)
- Elevation: 726 m (2,382 ft)

Population
  - Total: 53
  - Density: 5.1/km^{2} (13/sq mi)
- Time zone: UTC+01:00 (CET)
  - Summer (DST): UTC+02:00 (CEST)
- Postal code: 6692
- SFOS number: 5306
- ISO 3166 code: CH-TI
- Surrounded by: Broglio, Cavergno, Menzonio
- Website: SFSO statistics

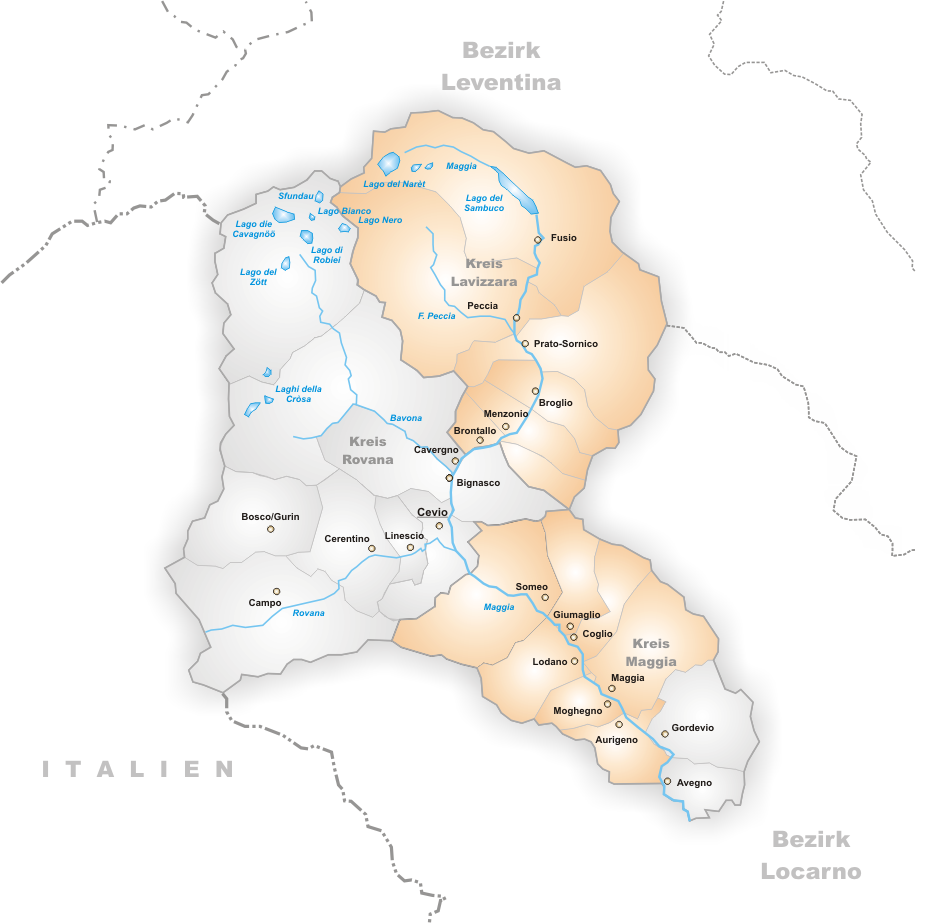
2003 map with Brontallo.

Brontallo is a village and former municipality in the district of Vallemaggia in the canton of Ticino, Switzerland.

In 2004 the municipality was merged with the other, neighboring municipalities Broglio, Fusio, Menzonio, Peccia and Prato-Sornico to form a new and larger municipality Lavizzara.

== History ==
Brontallo is first mentioned in 1364 as Bruntalo.

Until the beginning of the 15th century, it formed a community with Menzonio and together with Bignasco and Cavergno it formed a Vicinanza.

The church of S. Maria e S. Giorgio was first mentioned in the 15th century. In the 16th century it was rebuilt, and then renovated several times thereafter. Until 1513 it, along with Menzonio, was part of the parish of Cevio. In 1513 Menzonio broke away from Cevio, but Brontallo remained part of the parish until 1655.

The greatest population was during the 17th century. The population decline began in the 18th century, but accelerated into the 20th century. The road running from the village into the Val Lavizzara was completed in 1955. In 1990 less than a third of the workforce was employed in agriculture. Many of the homes in the village are now vacation homes.

== Geography ==
Brontallo has an area, as of 1997, of 10.46 square kilometers (4.04 sq mi). Of this area, 0.13 km^{2} (0.050 sq mi) or 1.2% is used for agricultural purposes, while 6 km^{2} (2.3 sq mi) or 57.4% is forested. Of the rest of the land, 0.05 km^{2} (12 acres) or 0.5% is settled (buildings or roads), 0.12 km^{2} (30 acres) or 1.1% is either rivers or lakes and 3.81 km^{2} (1.47 sq mi) or 36.4% is unproductive land.

Of the built up area, housing and buildings made up 0.2% and transportation infrastructure made up 0.3%. Out of the forested land, 41.7% of the total land area is heavily forested and 6.1% is covered with orchards or small clusters of trees. Of the agricultural land, 1.1% is used for growing crops. All the water in the municipality is flowing water. Of the unproductive areas, 16.5% is unproductive vegetation and 19.9% is too rocky for vegetation.

The village is located in the Vallemaggia district, on a terrace at an elevation of 716 m (2,349 ft) on the right side of the valley.

== Coat of arms ==
The blazon of the municipal coat of arms is Azure St. George armoured argent haloed and with a lance or standing on a dragon vert langued gules piercing it. St. George is the patron saint of the village church.

== Demographics ==
Brontallo has a population (As of December 2000) of 50.

Most of the population (as of 2000) speaks Italian language (46 or 92.0%), with German being second most common (2 or 4.0%) and French being third (1 or 2.0%).

Of the population in the village 32 or about 64.0% were born in Brontallo and lived there in 2000. There were 10 or 20.0% who were born in the same canton, while 4 or 8.0% were born somewhere else in Switzerland, and 4 or 8.0% were born outside of Switzerland. As of 2000, there were 23 people who were single and never married in the village. There were 21 married individuals, 6 widows or widowers and 0 individuals who are divorced.

There were 6 households that consist of only one person and 3 households with five or more people. Out of a total of 19 households that answered this question, 31.6% were households made up of just one person and 2 were adults who lived with their parents. Of the rest of the households, there are 2 married couples without children, 8 married couples with children There were 1 single parent with a child or children.

In 2000 there were 92 single-family homes (or 96.8% of the total) out of a total of 95 inhabited buildings. There were 3 multi-family buildings (3.2%). Of the single-family homes 4 were built before 1919, while 0 were built between 1990 and 2000. The greatest number of single-family homes (56) were built between 1919 and 1945.

In 2000 there were 98 apartments in the village. The most common apartment size was 2 rooms of which there were 27. There were 15 single room apartments and 15 apartments with five or more rooms. Of these apartments, a total of 19 apartments (19.4% of the total) were permanently occupied, while 79 apartments (80.6%) were seasonally occupied.

The historical population is given in the following chart:

== Economy ==
There were 13 residents of the village who were employed in some capacity, of which females made up 15.4% of the workforce. In 2000, there were 10 workers who commuted into the village and 8 workers who commuted away. The village is a net importer of workers, with about 1.3 workers entering the village for every one leaving.

== Religion ==
From the 2000 census, 45 or 90.0% were Roman Catholic, while 2 or 4.0% belonged to the Swiss Reformed Church. There was 1 person who belonged to no church, was agnostic or atheist, and 2 individuals (or about 4.00% of the population) did not answer the question.

== Education ==
In Brontallo about 18 or (36.0%) of the population have completed non-mandatory upper secondary education, and 5 or (10.0%) have completed additional higher education (either University or a Fachhochschule). Of the 5 who completed tertiary schooling, 80.0% were Swiss men, 20.0% were Swiss women.

As of 2000, there were 10 students from Brontallo who attended schools outside the village.
