= Beola =

Beola is a type of durable gneiss stone that is used in various types of construction. Beola is made up primarily of quartz, feldspar, and mica. It is often used as a more affordable and sturdy alternative to granite.

== Geology ==
Beola is a type of heterogeneous orthogneiss, and is a mylonite. It exhibits very strong lineation. It originates from the Ossola Valley in the Verbano Cusio Ossola district of Italy, an area rich with various types of useful stone. Many of its properties resemble those of granite. The mineral composition of Beola is Qtz+Kfs+Pl+Bt+WM. Beola has high wear resistance, but can easily be cut with a hammer and chisel. It also has high flexural strength.

== Uses ==
Due to the easiness of cutting Beola into thin slabs, it has been used since ancient times in various construction projects. It is well-suited to use as a cladding, and is still used today. Some notable buildings that feature Beola include the Church of San Giovanni Battista and the Monforte Tower in Milan. Historically, it was used for shingles (traditionally in the Aosta Valley), paving roads, fencing, support for grapevines, and also as a cooking stone.

== History ==
Beola has been quarried since the era of Ancient Rome. The quarries where it are found are thought to be some of the oldest in the Ossola Valley. It is used in the Roman Road near Beura, after which Beola is named. Beola trade picked up around the 13th century, following the opening of the Naviglio Grande. As a result, it is used in a large number of medieval structures in Milan. Also contributing to its popularity was its inexpensiveness to other types of stone, such as pink granite. Despite its low price, it was desired for many upscale buildings, and many palaces in the city of Piacenza utilize it.
