= Monforte Tower =

Residential skyscraper in Milan, Italy

- Torre Monforte (Italian)
- Monforte Tower in 2023
- Interactive map of the Monforte Tower area

General information
- Type: Residential
- Location: Milan, Italy, corso Monforte 36, via Mascagni 21
- Coordinates: 45°28′00.07″N 9°12′12.18″E

Height
- Height: 78 m (256 ft)

Monforte Tower (Italian: Torre Monforte) is a skyscraper in Milan, Italy.

== History ==
The building was erected in the 1950s, and was designed by a team composed of architect Alessandro Pasquali and engineer Carlo Galimberti.

== Description ==
Standing at a height of 78 metres (256 ft) with 18 floors, the highrise features a three-story base that supports the main structure of the tower proper. The property has dual access from Via Mascagni and Corso Monforte. The ground floor façade is clad with thick-slab Beola, and the higher stories with ceramic tile. On the via Mascagni façade, the piers and ground floor are clad with Serizzo Ossola while the higher towers are clad with ceramic tile.
