= Lago di Mognola =

Lake in Ticino, Switzerland

- Location within Canton of Ticino Location within Switzerland Location within Alps
- Interactive map of Lago di Mognola
- Location: Ticino
- Coordinates: 46°25′49″N 8°41′19″E
- Basin countries: Switzerland
- Surface elevation: 2,003 m (6,572 ft)

Lago di Mognola is a lake above Fusio in the canton of Ticino, Switzerland. It is located at an elevation of 2003 m.
