= Mogno =

Coordinates: 46°26′N 8°40′E

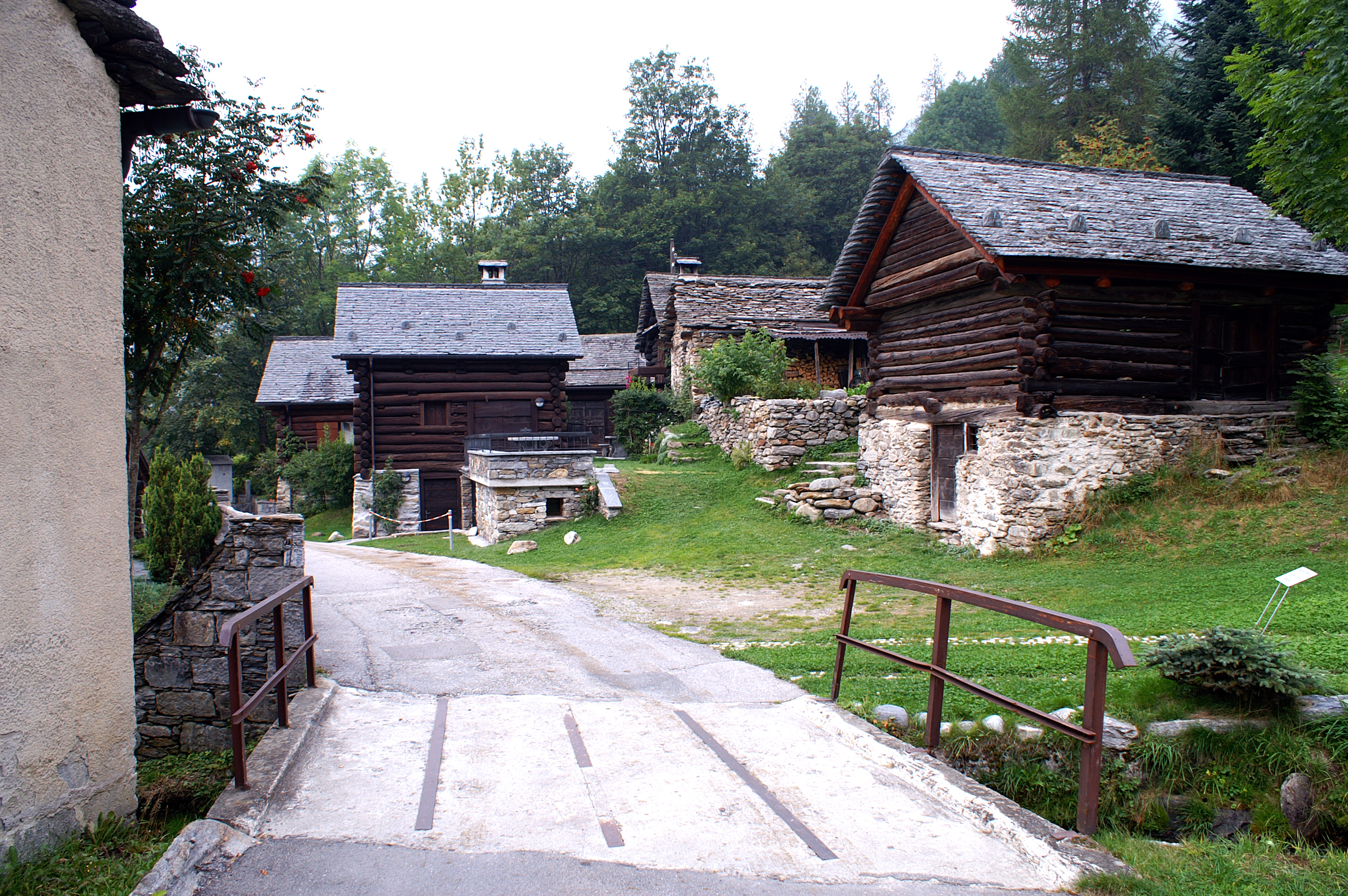
Mogno

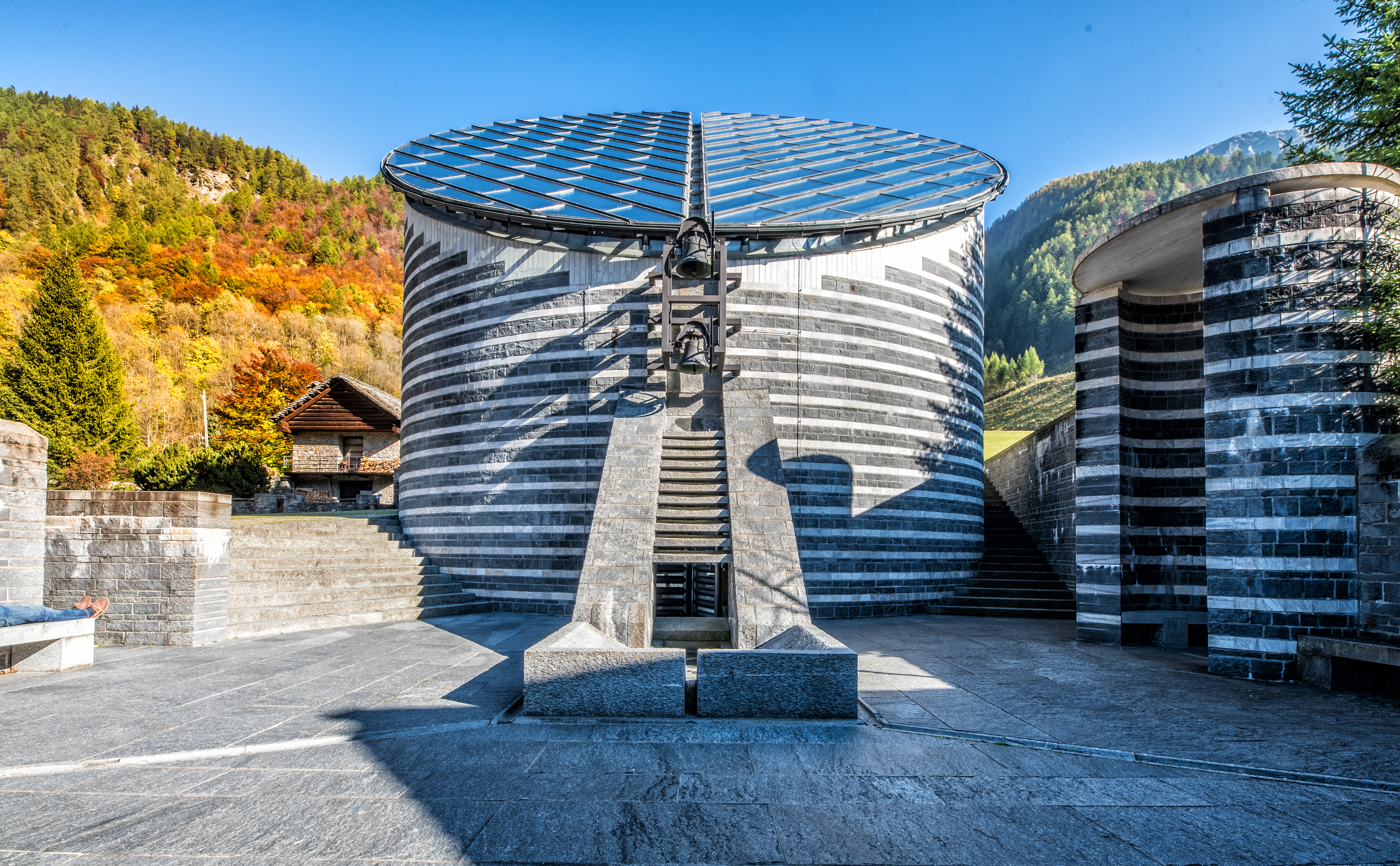
Church of San Giovanni Battista

Mogno is a village in Vallemaggia District in the canton of Ticino, Switzerland. Mogno is situated near the top of Val Lavizzara, a valley through which the upper Maggia River flows. It was formerly part of the municipality of Fusio, which merged with adjoining municipalities in 2004 to form the new municipality of Lavizzara.

In the 17th century, it possessed 50 taxable fireplaces. By 1801, the population had dropped to just 40 inhabitants. Today, it is no longer inhabited all year round and serves only as a holiday village. Before Mogno was incorporated in 1936 into Fusio, it was part of Peccia, and the land around the settlement was shared between Fusio, Peccia, Prato and Sornica.

Mogno is most noted for its modern marble-and-granite Church of San Giovanni Battista, designed by Ticinese architect Mario Botta. The church was erected between 1994 and 1996 on the site of its 350-year-old predecessor, which was levelled by an avalanche in 1986. This catastrophe also claimed several of the homes in the village, though no one was injured.

The original church of San Giovanni Battista Decollato was built in 1626 and was initially a chapel of ease of the parish of Peccia. Towards the end of the 17th century, it became an independent parish church. In 1940 it became part of the parish of Fusio.

The village is also home to one of the few remaining Ticinese watermills. Above Mogno is Alp Vaccariscio, famous for its high-altitude granite water pipe to irrigate the meadows, restored in 1998.
