= Sornico =

Village in Ticino, Switzerland

Coordinates: 46°23′N 8°40′E

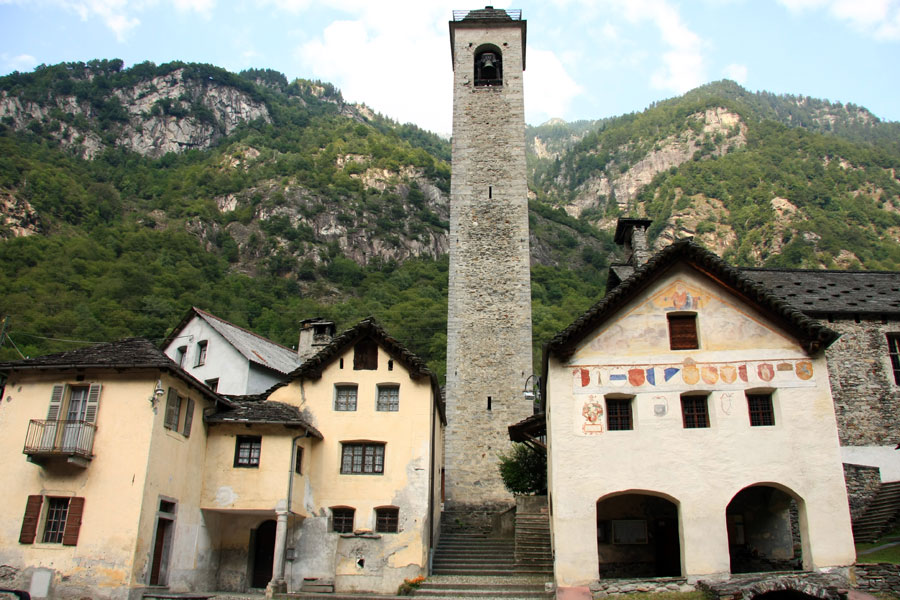
View of Prato-Sornico, seat of the municipality of Lavizzara, TI-CH

Sornico is a village and former municipality in the district of Vallemaggia in the canton of Ticino, Switzerland.

Sornico was a municipality of its own until 1864, when it merged with its neighbor Prato to form the new municipality Prato-Sornico.

In turn, Prato-Sornico municipality merged with its neighbors in 2004 to form a new and larger municipality Lavizzara.
