= Menzonio =

Village in Switzerland

Coordinates: 46°21′40″N 8°38′25″E

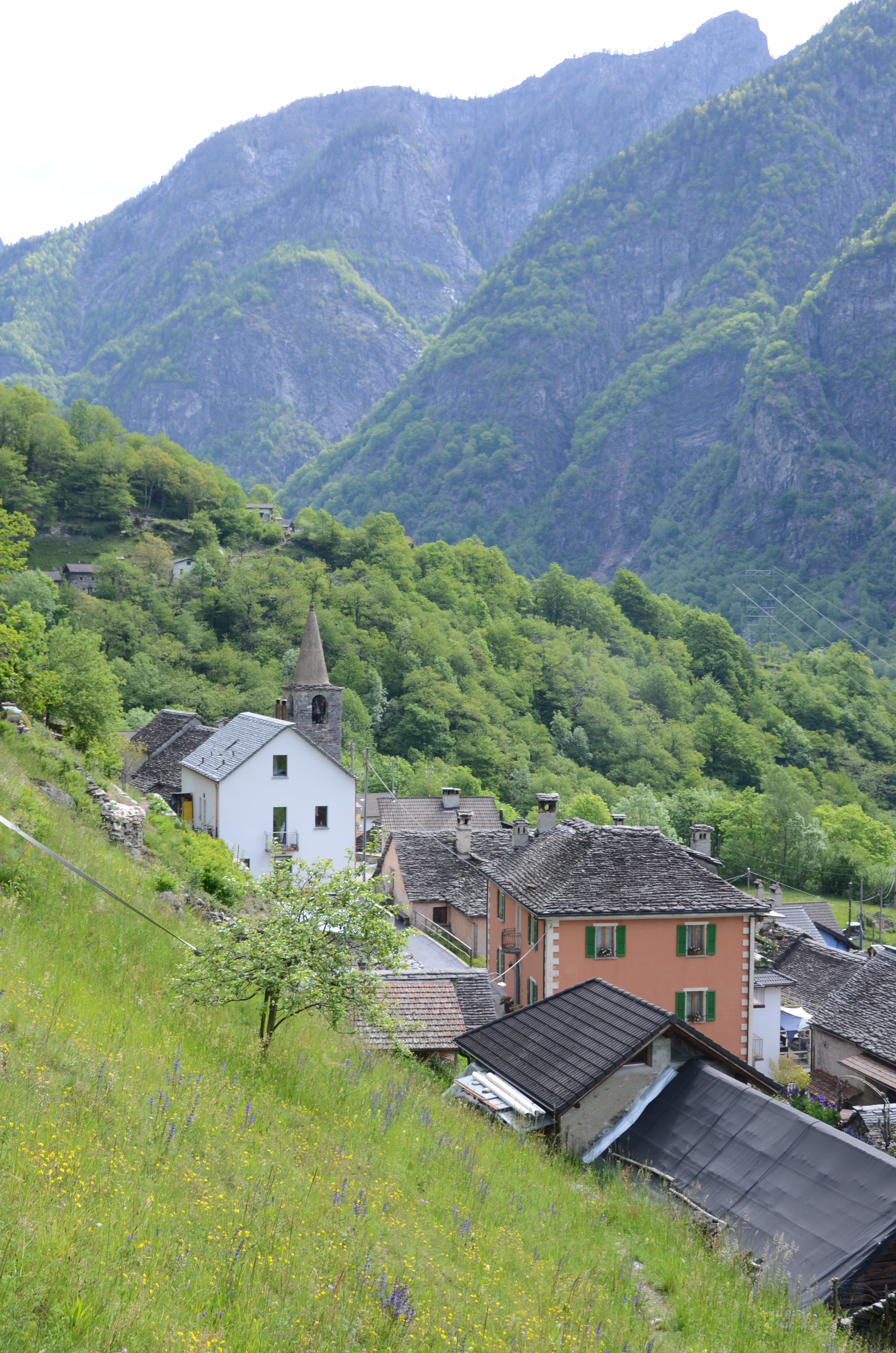
Menzonio

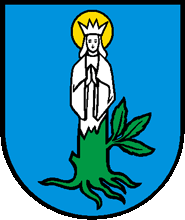
Coat of arms of Menzonio

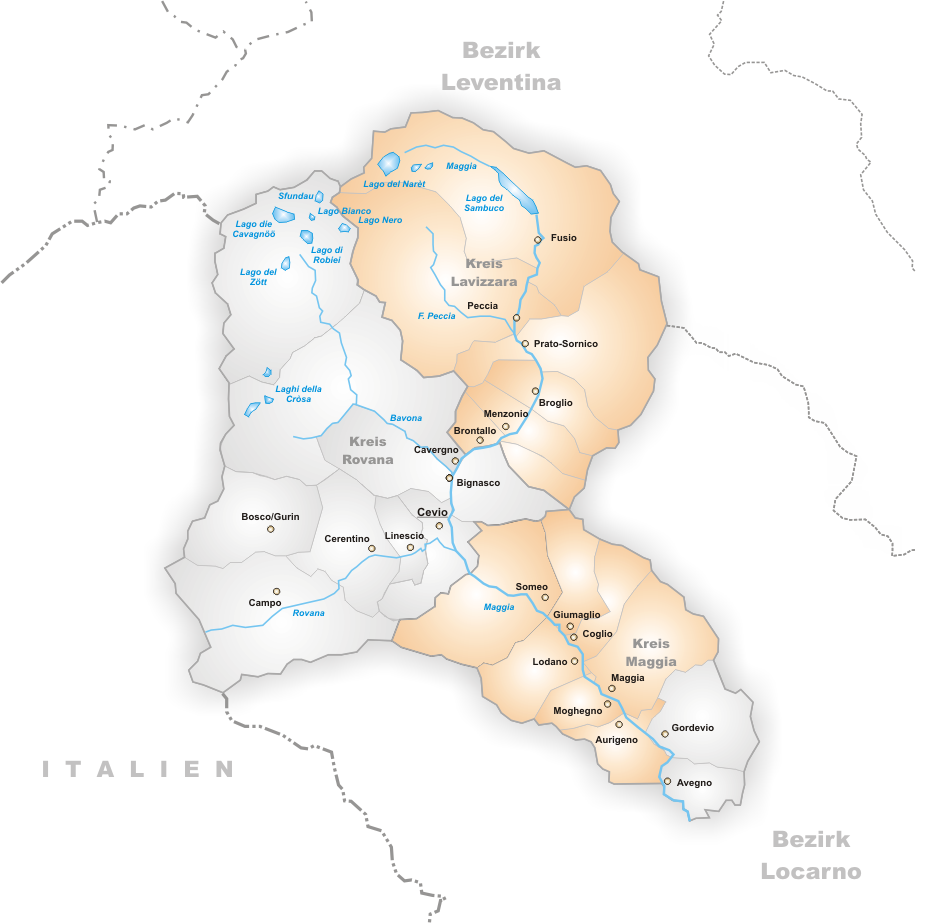
2003 map with Menzonio

Menzonio is a village and former municipality in the district of Vallemaggia in the canton of Ticino, Switzerland.

In 2004 the municipality was merged with the other, neighboring municipalities Broglio, Brontallo, Fusio, Peccia and Prato-Sornico to form a new and larger municipality Lavizzara.

== History ==
Menzonio is first mentioned in 1364 as Menzone. Until the beginning of the 15th century, Menzonio and Brontallo formed a single municipality, and together with Bignasco and Cavergno it formed a Vicinanza which was under the jurisdiction of the Lavizzara valley. At the time of the Swiss Confederation rule over Ticino, Menzonio was one of seven villages in the valley. The village church was part of the parish of Cevio until 1513 when it split away to form a parish with Brontallo. In 1655, this parish was dissolved and Menzonio formed its own parish. The Church of SS Giacomo e Filippo was first mentioned in the 15th century. The current building was built in 1585 and was rebuilt in 1644 and finally in 1905.

In the 17th century, the population reached its peak and then decreased gradually, initially because of emigration to Italy. Later the residents emigrated to California and finally they moved away from the villages to the cities of Ticino and the rest of Switzerland. For centuries the local economy was dominated by grazing and agriculture. In the 19th century there was a soapstone quarry and four mills. The road that connects Menzonio with the valley floor, was built in 1949. In 2000, three-quarters of the workforce were commuters.

== Geography ==
Menzonio has an area, as of 1997, of 10.68 square kilometers (4.12 sq mi). Of this area, 0.23 km^{2} (0.089 sq mi) or 2.2% is used for agricultural purposes, while 5.84 km^{2} (2.25 sq mi) or 54.7% is forested. Of the rest of the land, 0.09 km^{2} (22 acres) or 0.8% is settled (buildings or roads), 0.15 km^{2} (37 acres) or 1.4% is either rivers or lakes and 4.12 km^{2} (1.59 sq mi) or 38.6% is unproductive land.

Of the built up area, housing and buildings made up 0.6% and transportation infrastructure made up 0.2%. Out of the forested land, 38.6% of the total land area is heavily forested and 7.6% is covered with orchards or small clusters of trees. Of the agricultural land, 1.6% is used for growing crops. All the water in the municipality is flowing water. Of the unproductive areas, 18.4% is unproductive vegetation and 20.2% is too rocky for vegetation.

The village is located in the Vallemaggia district, on a terrace along the right side of the Val Lavizzara at an elevation of 732 m (2,402 ft).

== Coat of arms ==
The blazon of the municipal coat of arms is Azure St. Mary praying and crowned all argent haloed or issuant from a stump snagged and eradicated vert sprouting a branch with three leaves. The coat of arms refers to a local story. According to the story, due to the lack of arable land, many of the young men of Menzonio emigrated to Rome in search of work. One day, a group of emigrants came back carrying an image of the Blessed Virgin in a casket. They stopped outside the village to rest and set the casket on the stump of a cherry tree. When they arose and tried to pick up the casket, they discovered that the tree had grown up into the casket and it could not be moved.

== Demographics ==
Menzonio has a population (As of December 2000) of 73.

Most of the population (as of 2000) speaks Italian language (69 or 94.5%), with German being second most common (3 or 4.1%) and French being third (1 or 1.4%).

Of the population in the village 45 or about 61.6% were born in Menzonio and lived there in 2000. There were 17 or 23.3% who were born in the same canton, while 4 or 5.5% were born somewhere else in Switzerland, and 4 or 5.5% were born outside of Switzerland. As of 2000, there were 27 people who were single and never married in the village. There were 36 married individuals, 8 widows or widowers and 2 individuals who are divorced.

There were 14 households that consist of only one person and 1 households with five or more people. Out of a total of 34 households that answered this question, 41.2% were households made up of just one person. Of the rest of the households, there are 7 married couples without children, 10 married couples with children There were 3 single parents with a child or children. In 2000 there were 89 single-family homes (or 92.7% of the total) out of a total of 96 inhabited buildings. There were 6 multi-family buildings (6.3%), along with 1 multi-purpose building that were mostly used for housing. Of the single-family homes 7 were built before 1919, and none were built between 1990 and 2000. The greatest number of single-family homes (65) were built between 1919 and 1945.

In 2000 there were 103 apartments in the village. The most common apartment size was 3 rooms of which there were 27. There were 9 single room apartments and 30 apartments with five or more rooms. Of these apartments, a total of 34 apartments (33.0% of the total) were permanently occupied, while 68 apartments (66.0%) were seasonally occupied and 1 apartment (1.0%) were empty.

The historical population is given in the following chart:

== Economy ==
There were 32 residents of the village who were employed in some capacity, of which females made up 37.5% of the workforce. In 2000, there were 26 workers who commuted away from the village.

== Religion ==
From the 2000 census, 64 or 87.7% were Roman Catholic, while or 0.0% belonged to the Swiss Reformed Church. There were 3 (or about 4.11% of the population) belonged to no church, are agnostic or atheist, and 6 individuals (or about 8.22% of the population) did not answer the question.

== Education ==
In Menzonio about 25 or (34.2%) of the population have completed non-mandatory upper secondary education, and 9 or (12.3%) have completed additional higher education (either University or a Fachhochschule). Of the 9 who completed tertiary schooling, 33.3% were Swiss men, 55.6% were Swiss women.

As of 2000, there were 4 students from Menzonio who attended schools outside the village.
