= Prato-Sornico =

Coordinates: 46.3964°N 8.6552°E

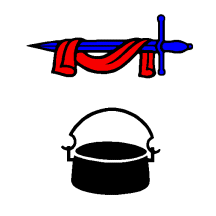
Flag

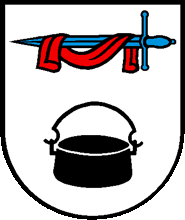
Coat of arms

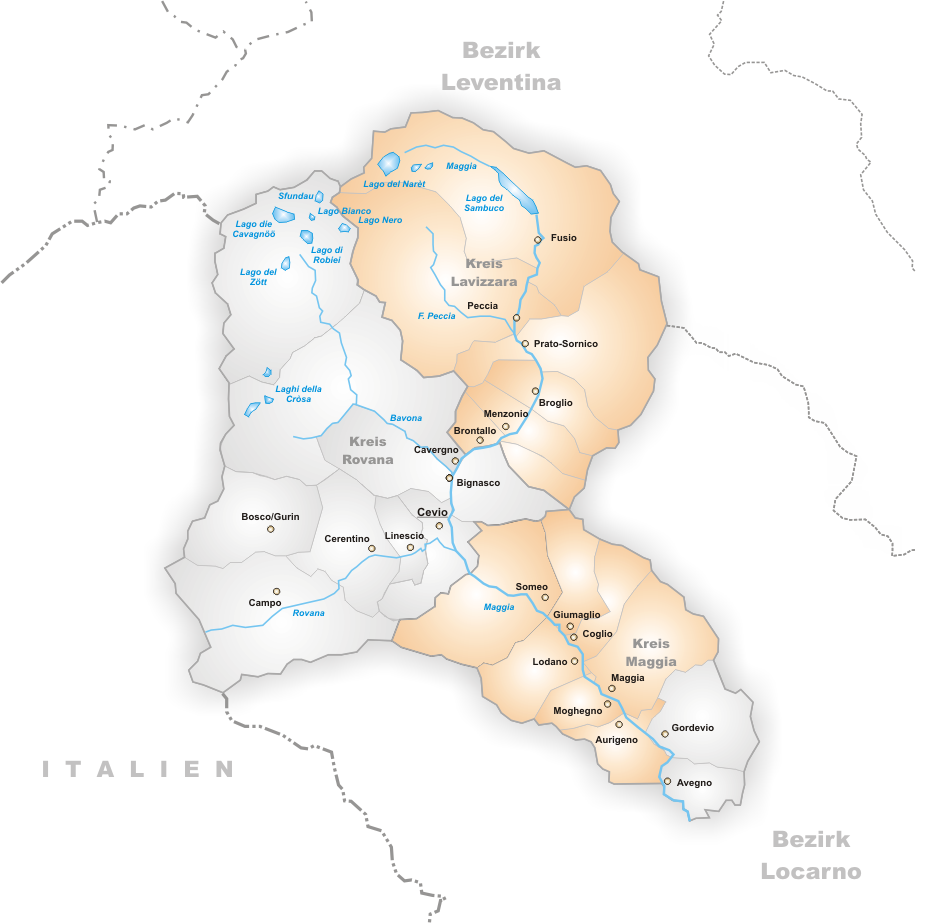
2003 map with Prato-Sornico.

Prato-Sornico is a former municipality in the district of Vallemaggia in the canton of Ticino, Switzerland.

The municipality contained the villages Prato and Sornico. These entities were former municipalities of their own, having been merged to form Prato-Sornico in 1864.

In 2004 Prato-Sornico municipality was merged with the other, neighboring municipalities Broglio, Brontallo, Fusio, Menzonio and Peccia to form a new and larger municipality Lavizzara.

== History ==
Prato and Sornico were first mentioned in 1374.

Prato and Sornico, along with Broglio, Fusio and Peccia, formed the valley community of Lavizzara. In 1374, the community dissolved and the villages of Prato and Sornico became independent. The common, shared land of the four communities of Fusio, Peccia, Prato and Sornico (known as the comunella dei quattro comuni) remained shared until 1929. In the 15th century, the hamlet was the seat of the General Council of the valley, then the seat of the Swiss Confederation governor between 1513 and 1798. After 1803 it was the capital of the sub-district of Lavizzara. Even today stately houses in the village testify of its political and religious importance of the village. One of the houses in the village, which was built in the 15th century, extended in the 16th century and renovated in 1975–77, served as the seat of the bailiff and a prison. Another house, in Prato, is Casa Berna which is from the 18th century. It contains the rich library of Giulio Giovanni Gerolamo Berna, the archpriest of Locarno.

The church of San Martino in Sornico is first mentioned in the 14th century, but probably dates back to the 11th century. It was the mother church in the 16th century of the Val Lavizzara and in 1747 was made a provost's church. The parish church of SS Fabiano e Sebastiano in Prato was built in 1487, rebuilt in 1730 and re-consecrated in 1761 by the Bishop of Como.

In the 19th and 20th century, the emigration overseas and into the cities led to a sharp population decline. In this alpine village at the beginning of the 21st century, one-third of the workforce still works in agriculture. In the last decades of the 20th century, many vacation homes and tourist infrastructure were built in the village.

== Geography ==
Prato-Sornico has an area, as of 1997, of 38.34 square kilometers (14.80 sq mi). Of this area, 0.2 km^{2} (0.077 sq mi) or 0.5% is used for agricultural purposes, while 11.47 km^{2} (4.43 sq mi) or 29.9% is forested. Of the rest of the land, 0.1 km^{2} (25 acres) or 0.3% is settled (buildings or roads), 0.36 km^{2} (0.14 sq mi) or 0.9% is either rivers or lakes and 20.71 km^{2} (8.00 sq mi) or 54.0% is unproductive land.

Of the built up area, housing and buildings made up 0.1% and transportation infrastructure made up 0.1%. Out of the forested land, 18.6% of the total land area is heavily forested and 5.5% is covered with orchards or small clusters of trees. Of the agricultural land, 0.4% is used for growing crops. All the water in the municipality is flowing water. Of the unproductive areas, 23.2% is unproductive vegetation and 30.9% is too rocky for vegetation.

The village is located in the Vallemaggia district. It is located about 37 km (23 mi) from Locarno. It was created in 1864 when the hamlets of Prato and Sornico merged. The village boundaries include the peak of Pizzo Campo Tencia which is 3,071 m (10,075 ft) high.

== Coat of arms ==
The blazon of the municipal coat of arms is Argent in chief a cloth gules hanging from a sword azure fesswise point to dexter and in base a pot sable. The pot is a traditional symbol of the Lavizzara valley.

== Demographics ==
Prato-Sornico has a population (As of December 2000) of 104.

Most of the population (as of 2000) speaks Italian language (96 or 92.3%), with German being second most common (4 or 3.8%) and Spanish being third (2 or 1.9%). There is 1 person who speaksFrench and people who speak Romansh.

Of the population in the village 63 or about 60.6% were born in Prato-Sornico and lived there in 2000. There were 24 or 23.1% who were born in the same canton, while 8 or 7.7% were born somewhere else in Switzerland, and 9 or 8.7% were born outside of Switzerland. As of 2000, there were 43 people who were single and never married in the village. There were 52 married individuals, 7 widows or widowers and 2 individuals who are divorced.

There were 8 households that consist of only one person and 2 households with five or more people. Out of a total of 41 households that answered this question, 19.5% were households made up of just one person and 2 were adults who lived with their parents. Of the rest of the households, there are 10 married couples without children, 15 married couples with children There were 1 single parents with a child or children. There were 4 households that were made up unrelated people and 1 household that was made some sort of institution or another collective housing.

In 2000 there were 73 single-family homes (or 93.6% of the total) out of a total of 78 inhabited buildings. There were 2 multi-family buildings (2.6%), along with multi-purpose buildings that were mostly used for housing (0.0%) and 3 other use buildings (commercial or industrial) that also had some housing (3.8%). Of the single-family homes 9 were built before 1919, while 0 were built between 1990 and 2000. The greatest number of single-family homes (38) were built between 1919 and 1945.

In 2000 there were 80 apartments in the village. The most common apartment size was 4 rooms of which there were 21. There were 3 single room apartments and 24 apartments with five or more rooms. Of these apartments, a total of 39 apartments (48.8% of the total) were permanently occupied, while 41 apartments (51.3%) were seasonally occupied.

The historical population is given in the following chart:

== Economy ==
There were 50 residents of the village who were employed in some capacity, of which females made up 28.0% of the workforce. In 2000, there were 15 workers who commuted into the village and 24 workers who commuted away. The village is a net exporter of workers, with about 1.6 workers leaving the village for every one entering.

== Religion ==
From the 2000 census, 95 or 91.3% were Roman Catholic, while 3 or 2.9% belonged to the Swiss Reformed Church. Of the rest of the population, and there was 1 individual who belongs to another Christian church. There were 4 (or about 3.85% of the population) who belonged to no church, are agnostic or atheist, and 1 individuals (or about 0.96% of the population) did not answer the question.

== Education ==
In Prato-Sornico about 36 or (34.6%) of the population have completed non-mandatory upper secondary education, and 4 or (3.8%) have completed additional higher education (either University or a Fachhochschule). Of the 4 who completed tertiary schooling, all were Swiss men. As of 2000, there were 1 students in Prato-Sornico who came from another village, while 6 residents attended schools outside the village.
