= Fusio =

Village in Ticino, Switzerland

Coordinates: 46°26′N 8°39′E

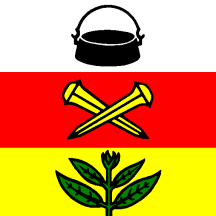
Flag of Fusio.

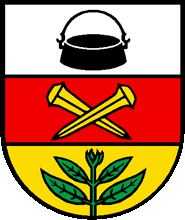
Cost of arms of Fusio.

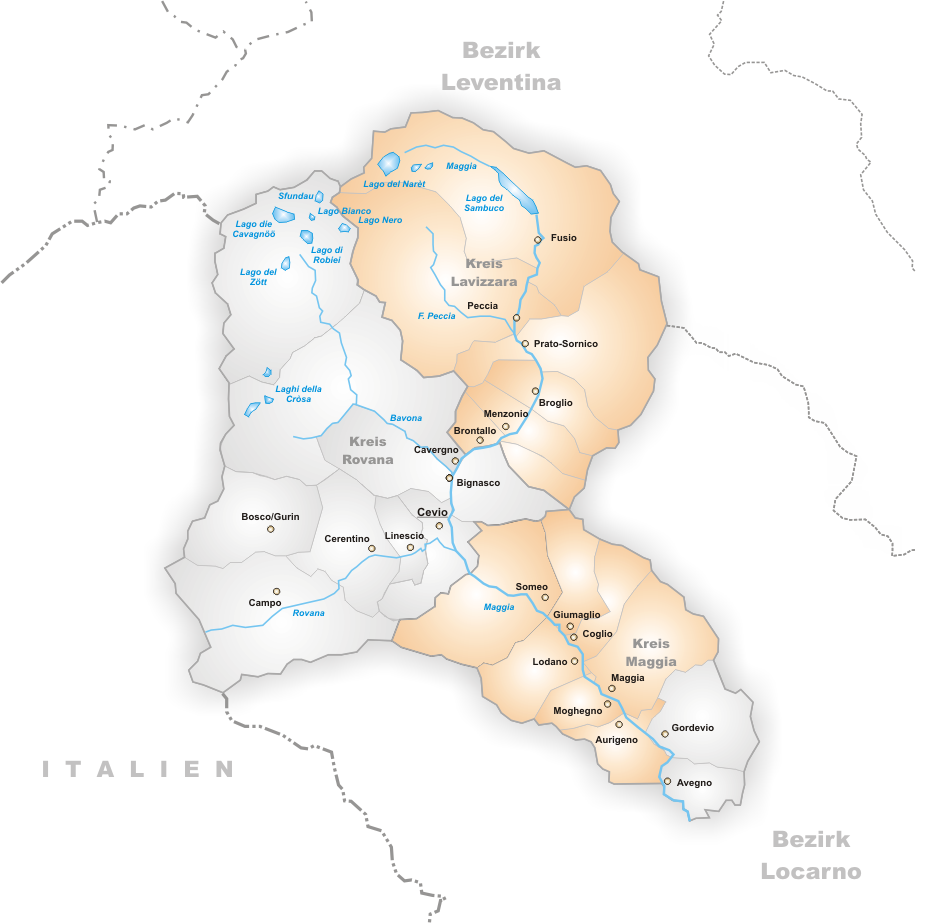
2003 map of Vallemaggia with Fusio in the top right.

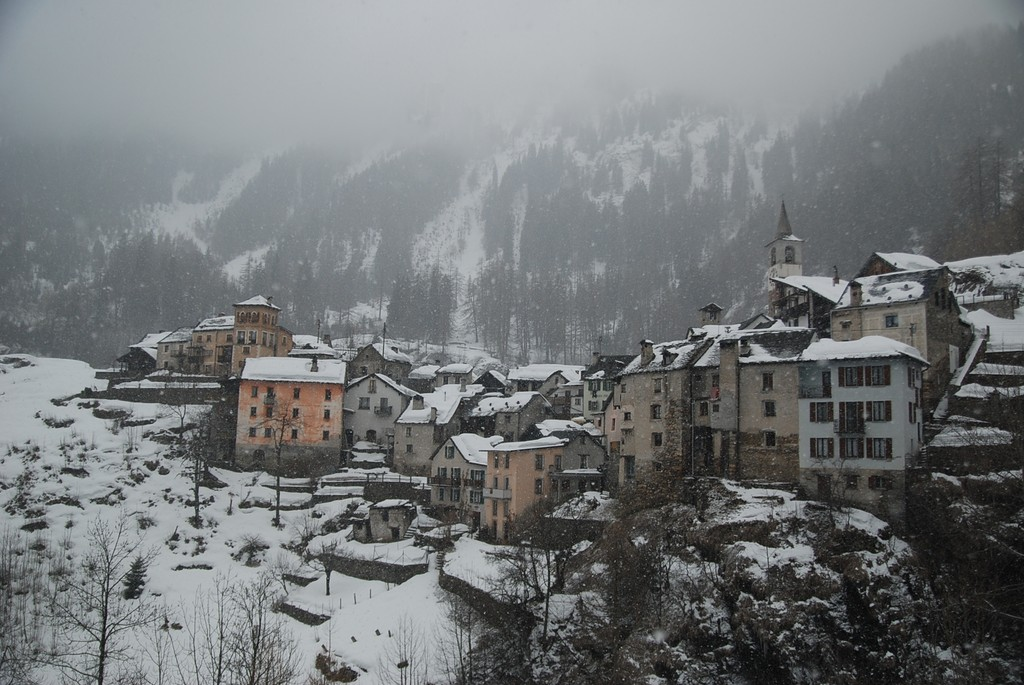
Fusio in winter

Fusio is a village and former municipality in the district of Vallemaggia in the canton of Ticino, Switzerland.

In 2004 the municipality was merged with the other, neighboring municipalities Broglio, Brontallo, Menzonio, Peccia and Prato-Sornico to form a new and larger municipality Lavizzara.

== History ==
Fusio is first mentioned in 1258 as Fuxio.

The population reached its peak in the 16th–17th century (400–500 inhabitants), but towards the end of the 18th century began a slow decline. This slow decline accelerated dramatically after 1950 because of emigration to the cities. Most of the remaining population is elderly.

The church, consecrated in 1455 to the Beata Vergine Assunta, was a Chapel of ease of Sornico until the 16th century. It was later rebuilt several times, mainly in the 17th century.

The local economy relied on livestock, pastures and forestry. The village possessed vast pastures and alpine pastures, which explains the relatively small number of emigrants overseas. Until the second half of the 19th century, there were two mines in the village that produced steatite (soapstone). Through the construction of the dam in the Sambuco valley (1950–56) the amount of agricultural land has been reduced. From the 1980s a number of houses and an inn were built.

The hamlet of Mogno was also part of the village. In the 17th century it possessed 50 taxable fireplaces. By 1801, the population had dropped to just 40 inhabitants. Today it is no longer inhabited all year round and serves only as a holiday village. Before Mogno was incorporated in 1936 into Fusio it was part of Peccia, and the land around the settlement was shared between Fusio, Peccia and Prato-Sornico.

The church of San Giovanni Battista Decollato was built in 1626 and was initially a chapel of ease of the parish of Peccia. Towards the end of the 17th century it became an independent parish church. In 1940 it became part of the parish of Fusio. The church was destroyed in 1986 by an avalanche. The new building, by Mario Botta, was built in 1997 after 10 years of planning and construction work. The unique construction of the building has already become a point of interest and a source of critical debate.

== Geography ==
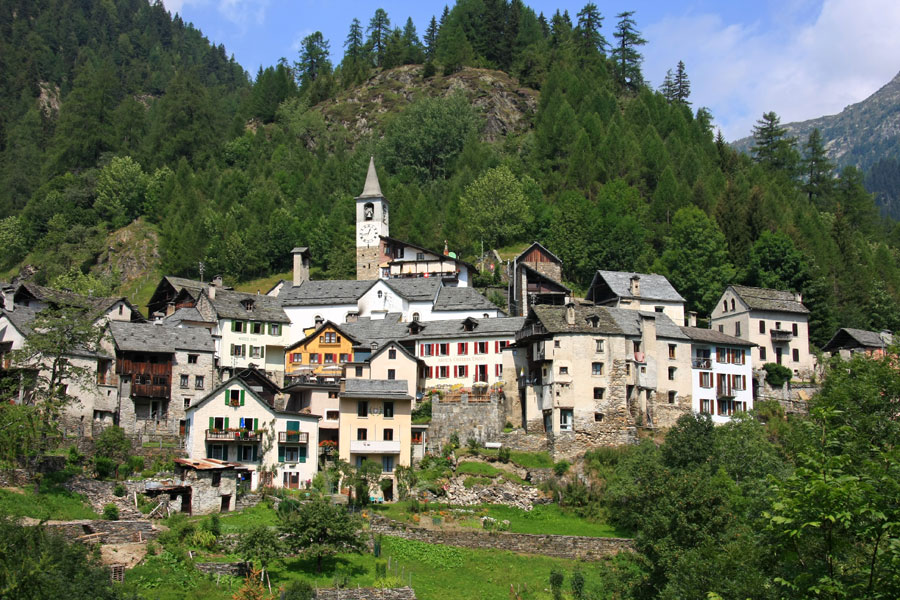
Fusio from the road into the village

Aerial view (1954)

Fusio has an area, as of 1997, of 60.78 square kilometers (23.47 sq mi). Of this area, 0.58 km^{2} (0.22 sq mi) or 1.0% is used for agricultural purposes, while 11.97 km^{2} (4.62 sq mi) or 19.7% is forested. Of the rest of the land, 0.41 km^{2} (0.16 sq mi) or 0.7% is settled (buildings or roads), 2.56 km^{2} (0.99 sq mi) or 4.2% is either rivers or lakes and 34.23 km^{2} (13.22 sq mi) or 56.3% is unproductive land.

Of the built up area, housing and buildings made up 0.1% and transportation infrastructure made up 0.4%. Out of the forested land, 13.8% of the total land area is heavily forested and 2.7% is covered with orchards or small clusters of trees. Of the agricultural land, 0.8% is used for growing crops. Of the water in the village, 3.6% is in lakes and 0.6% is in rivers and streams. Of the unproductive areas, 26.4% is unproductive vegetation and 29.9% is too rocky for vegetation.

The village is located in the Vallemaggia district. It is the upper most village in the Val Lavizzara at an elevation of 1,289 m (4,229 ft). It is 46 km (29 mi) from Locarno. Lago di Mognola is located above the village.

The former municipality also contained the village of Mogno.

== Coat of arms ==
The blazon of the municipal coat of arms is Tierced argent a pot sable gules two nails or in saltire and or a tobacco plant issuant vert. The pot is the symbol of the Lavizzara valley. The nails and tobacco are canting on the names of two families in the village. The Chiodi (Italian: chiodo or nail) and the Tabacchi (Italian: tabacco or tobacco).

== Demographics ==
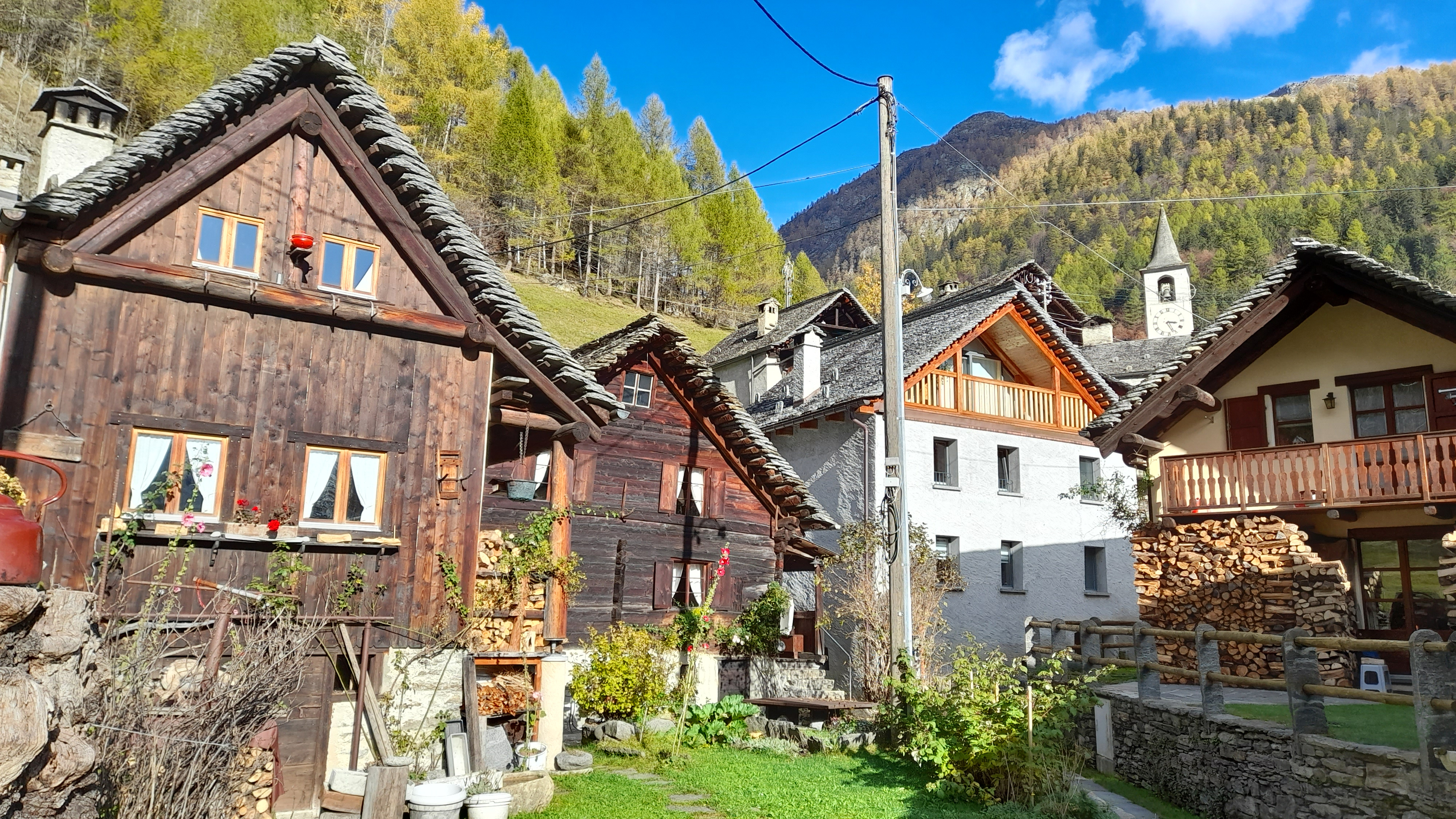
Houses in Fusio

Fusio has a population (As of December 2000) of 45. Over the last 10 years (1997–2007) the population has changed at a rate of 0%.

Most of the population (as of 2000) speaks Italian language (40 or 88.9%), with German being second most common (4 or 8.9%) and Portuguese being third (1 or 2.2%).

Of the population in the village 30 or about 66.7% were born in Fusio and lived there in 2000. There were 3 or 6.7% who were born in the same canton, while 5 or 11.1% were born somewhere else in Switzerland, and 5 or 11.1% were born outside of Switzerland. As of 2000, there were 16 people who were single and never married in the village. There were 23 married individuals, 5 widows or widowers and 1 individuals who was divorced.

There were 8 households that consist of only one person and households with five or more people. Out of a total of 22 households that answered this question, 36.4% were households made up of just one person and 2 were adults who lived with their parents. Of the rest of the households, there are 4 married couples without children, 6 married couples with children There was 1 single parent with a child or children.

In 2000 there were 103 single-family homes (or 92.0% of the total) out of a total of 112 inhabited buildings. There were 4 multi-family buildings (3.6%) and 5 other use buildings (commercial or industrial) that also had some housing (4.5%). Of the single-family homes 1 was built before 1919, while 1 was built between 1990 and 2000. The greatest number of single-family homes (60) were built between 1919 and 1945.

In 2000 there were 113 apartments in the village. The most common apartment size was 3 rooms of which there were 32. There were 11 single room apartments and 17 apartments with five or more rooms. Of these apartments, a total of 20 apartments (17.7% of the total) were permanently occupied, while 93 apartments (82.3%) were seasonally occupied.

The historical population is given in the following chart:

== Economy ==
There were 16 residents of the village who were employed in some capacity, of which females made up 37.5% of the workforce. In 2000, there were 4 workers who commuted away from the village.

== Religion ==
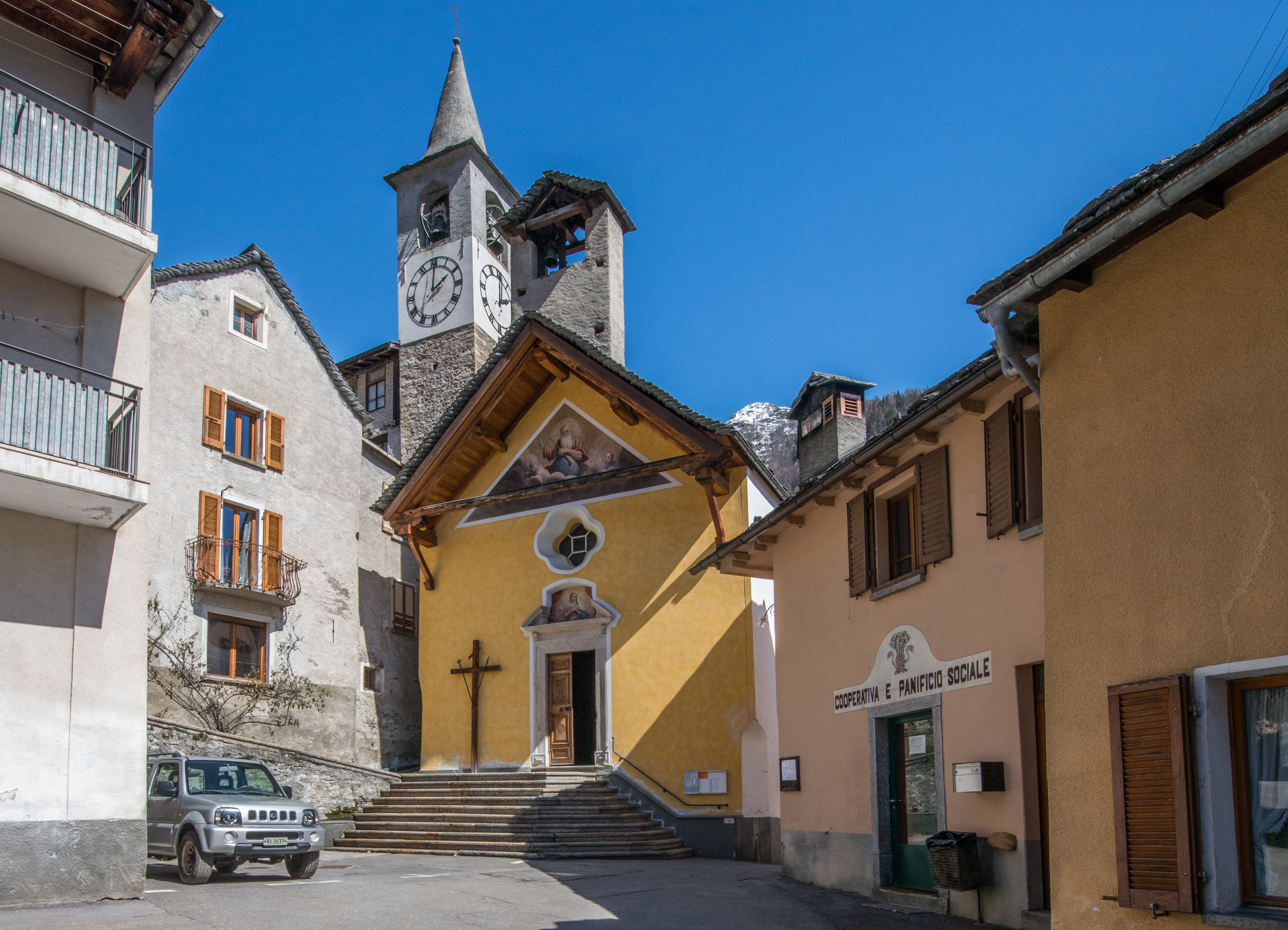
Center of Fusio village, with the village church

From the 2000 census, 41 or 91.1% were Roman Catholic, while or 0.0% belonged to the Swiss Reformed Church. Of the rest of the population, and there was 1 individual who belongs to another Christian church. There were 3 (or about 6.67% of the population) who belonged to no church, are agnostic or atheist.

== Education ==
In Fusio about 12 or (26.7%) of the population have completed non-mandatory upper secondary education, and 3 or (6.7%) have completed additional higher education (either University or a Fachhochschule). Of the 3 who completed tertiary schooling, all were Swiss men.

As of 2000, there was 1 student from Fusio who attended school outside the village.
