= Broglio, Switzerland =

Village in Switzerland

Coordinates: 46°23′N 8°40′E

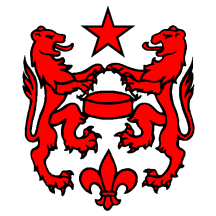
Flag of Broglio

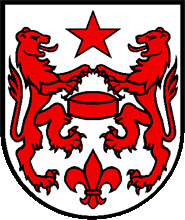
Coat of arms of Broglio

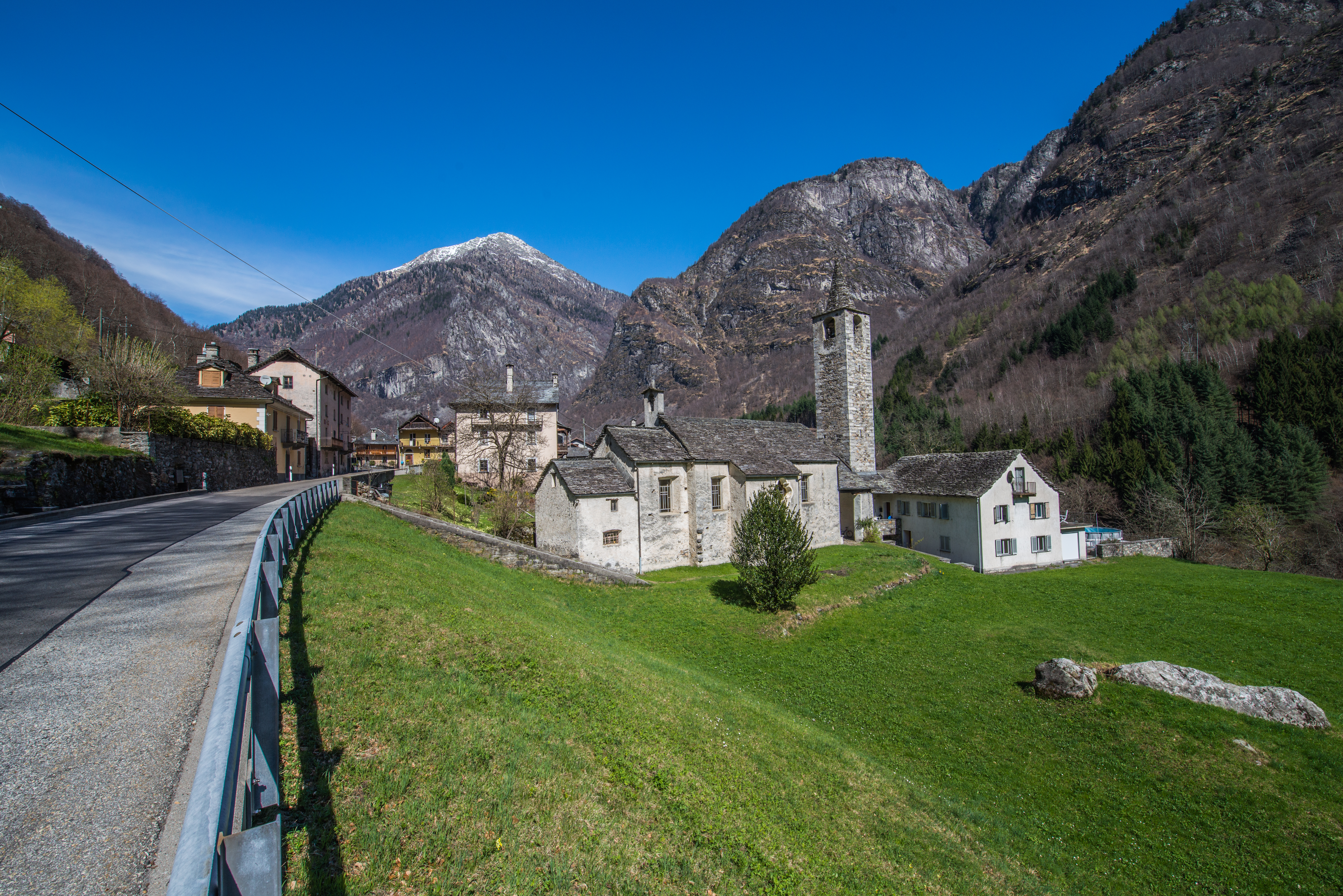

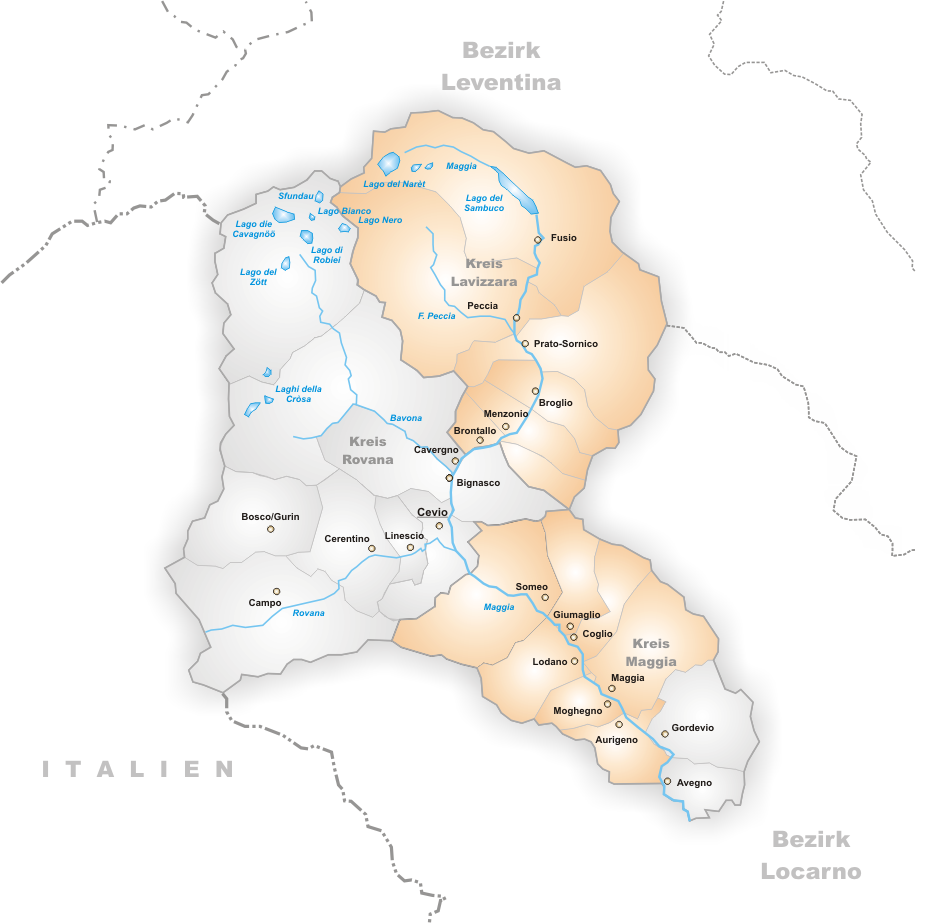
2003 map with Broglio, Switzerland.

Broglio is a village and former municipality in the district of Vallemaggia in the canton of Ticino, Switzerland.

In 2004 the municipality was merged with the other, neighboring municipalities Brontallo, Fusio, Menzonio, Peccia and Prato-Sornico to form a new and larger municipality Lavizzara.

== History ==
Broglio is first mentioned in 1361 as Brono.

The existing village area has developed in several stages. It was created in 1374, when the valley (comunità) Lavizzara broke up and divided its lands. At the end of the 16th century, it grew again through a series of agreements between the neighboring communities.

The Church of S. Maria Lauretana was dedicated in 1487. In the following centuries, it was repeatedly rebuilt and restored. It belonged to the Sornico parish until 1616, when it became an independent parish. The historically significant building, Casa Pometta, is from the 17th century.

The highest population in the village was during the 17th century. The slow population decline intensified in the late 19th century with emigration to the cities and to other countries. In 1990, agriculture and livestock, which for centuries were the main sources of income, employed about a third of the workforce. In recent decades, the number of vacation homes has increased markedly.

== Geography ==
Broglio has an area, as of 1997, of 12.94 square kilometers (5.00 sq mi). Of this area, 0.26 km^{2} (0.10 sq mi) or 2.0% is used for agricultural purposes, while 6.88 km^{2} (2.66 sq mi) or 53.2% is forested. Of the rest of the land, 0.15 km^{2} (37 acres) or 1.2% is settled (buildings or roads), 0.25 km^{2} (0.097 sq mi) or 1.9% is either rivers or lakes and 5.33 km^{2} (2.06 sq mi) or 41.2% is unproductive land.

Of the built up area, housing and buildings made up 0.7% and transportation infrastructure made up 0.5%. Out of the forested land, 41.4% of the total land area is heavily forested and 8.0% is covered with orchards or small clusters of trees. Of the agricultural land, 1.3% is used for growing crops. Of the water in the village, 0.5% is in lakes and 1.5% is in rivers and streams. Of the unproductive areas, 18.9% is unproductive vegetation and 22.3% is too rocky for vegetation.

The village is located in the Vallemaggia district, about 35 km (22 mi) from Locarno on the road to Fusio.

== Coat of arms ==
The blazon of the municipal coat of arms is Argent a pot between two lions rampant reguardant and in chief a mullet of five and in base a fleur de lis all gules. The pot is taken from the old seal of the Lavizzara valley. The other symbols are for the four oldest families of the village: the lions the Coraggioni and Pometta, the star the Pescatore and the fleur de lis the Demaria families.

== Demographics ==
Broglio has a population (As of December 2000) of 88. Most of the population (as of 2000) speaks Italian language (86 or 97.7%) with the rest speaking German

Of the population in the village 52 or about 59.1% were born in Broglio and lived there in 2000. There were 26 or 29.5% who were born in the same canton, while 6 or 6.8% were born somewhere else in Switzerland, and 3 or 3.4% were born outside of Switzerland.

As of 2000, there were 38 people who were single and never married in the village. There were 42 married individuals, 7 widows or widowers and 1 individuals who are divorced.

As of 2000 the average number of residents per living room was which is fewer people per room than the cantonal average of 0.6 per room. In this case, a room is defined as space of a housing unit of at least 4 m^{2} (43 sq ft) as normal bedrooms, dining rooms, living rooms, kitchens and habitable cellars and attics. About % of the total households were owner-occupied, or in other words did not pay rent (though they may have a mortgage or a rent-to-own agreement).

As of 2000 there were 11 households that consist of only one person and 4 households with five or more people. Out of a total of 34 households that answered this question, 32.4% were households made up of just one person and 2 were adults who lived with their parents. Of the rest of the households, there are 7 married couples without children, 13 married couples with children There were 1 single parents with a child or children.

In 2000 there were 103 single-family homes (or 92.8% of the total) out of a total of 111 inhabited buildings. There were 6 multi-family buildings (5.4%), along with multi-purpose buildings that were mostly used for housing (0.0%) and 2 other use buildings (commercial or industrial) that also had some housing (1.8%). Of the single-family homes 17 were built before 1919, while 1 were built between 1990 and 2000. The greatest number of single-family homes (66) were built between 1919 and 1945.

In 2000 there were 117 apartments in the village. The most common apartment size was 4 rooms of which there were 33. There were 15 single room apartments and 24 apartments with five or more rooms. Of these apartments, a total of 34 apartments (29.1% of the total) were permanently occupied, while 82 apartments (70.1%) were seasonally occupied and 1 apartments (0.9%) were empty.

The historical population is given in the following chart:

== Economy ==
There were 39 residents of the village who were employed in some capacity, of which females made up 38.5% of the workforce. In 2000, there were 32 workers who commuted away from the village.

== Religion ==
From the 2000 census, 86 or 97.7% were Roman Catholic, while 1 or 1.1% belonged to the Swiss Reformed Church. There was 1 person who belonged to no church, was agnostic or atheist.

== Education ==
In Broglio about 34 or (38.6%) of the population have completed non-mandatory upper secondary education, and 4 or (4.5%) have completed additional higher education (either University or a Fachhochschule). Of the 4 who completed tertiary schooling, 50.0% were Swiss men, 50.0% were Swiss women.

As of 2000, there were 17 students from Broglio who attended schools outside the village.
