= Peccia =

Village in the canton of Ticino, Switzerland

Coordinates: 46°24′N 8°39′E

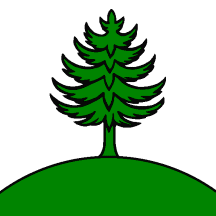
Flag

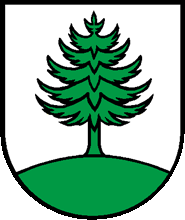
Coat of arms

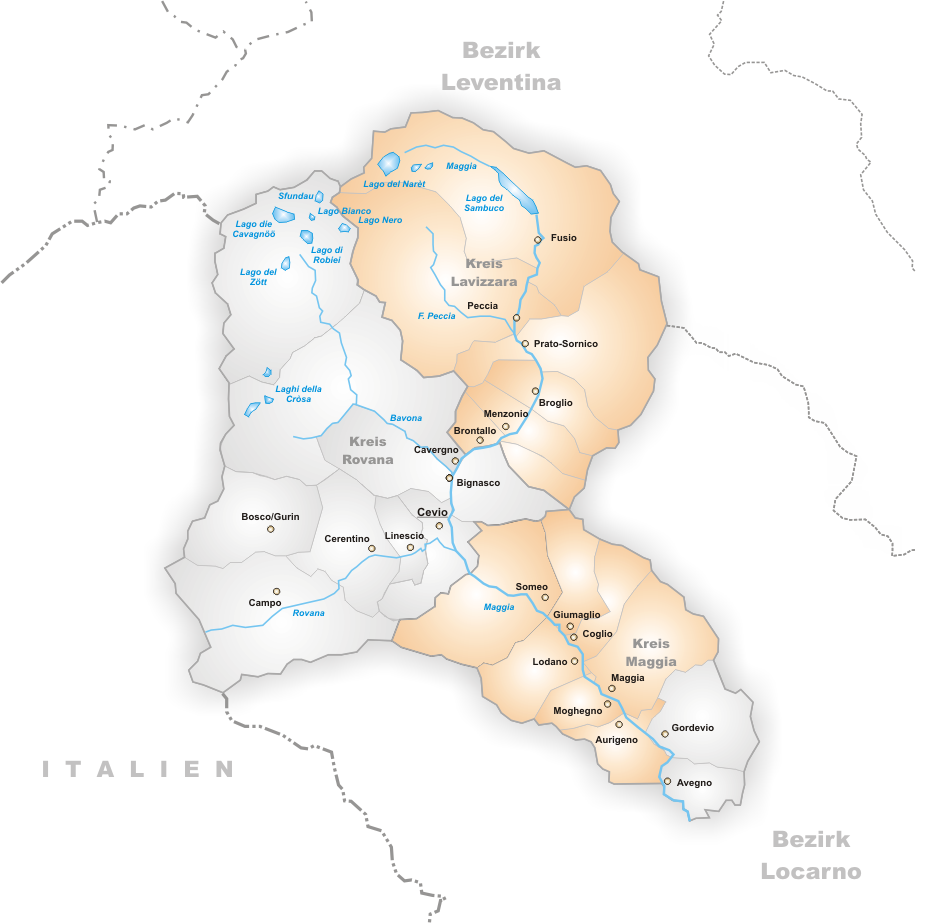
2003 map with Peccia.

Peccia is one of six municipalities in the canton of Ticino (Switzerland) which merged in April 2004 to form the commune of Lavizzara, with about 1000 people. The other municipalities were Broglio, Brontallo, Fusio, Menzonio, and Prato-Sornico. The fractions of Peccia are: Veglia (Véia), Cortignelli, San Carlo and Piano di Peccia.

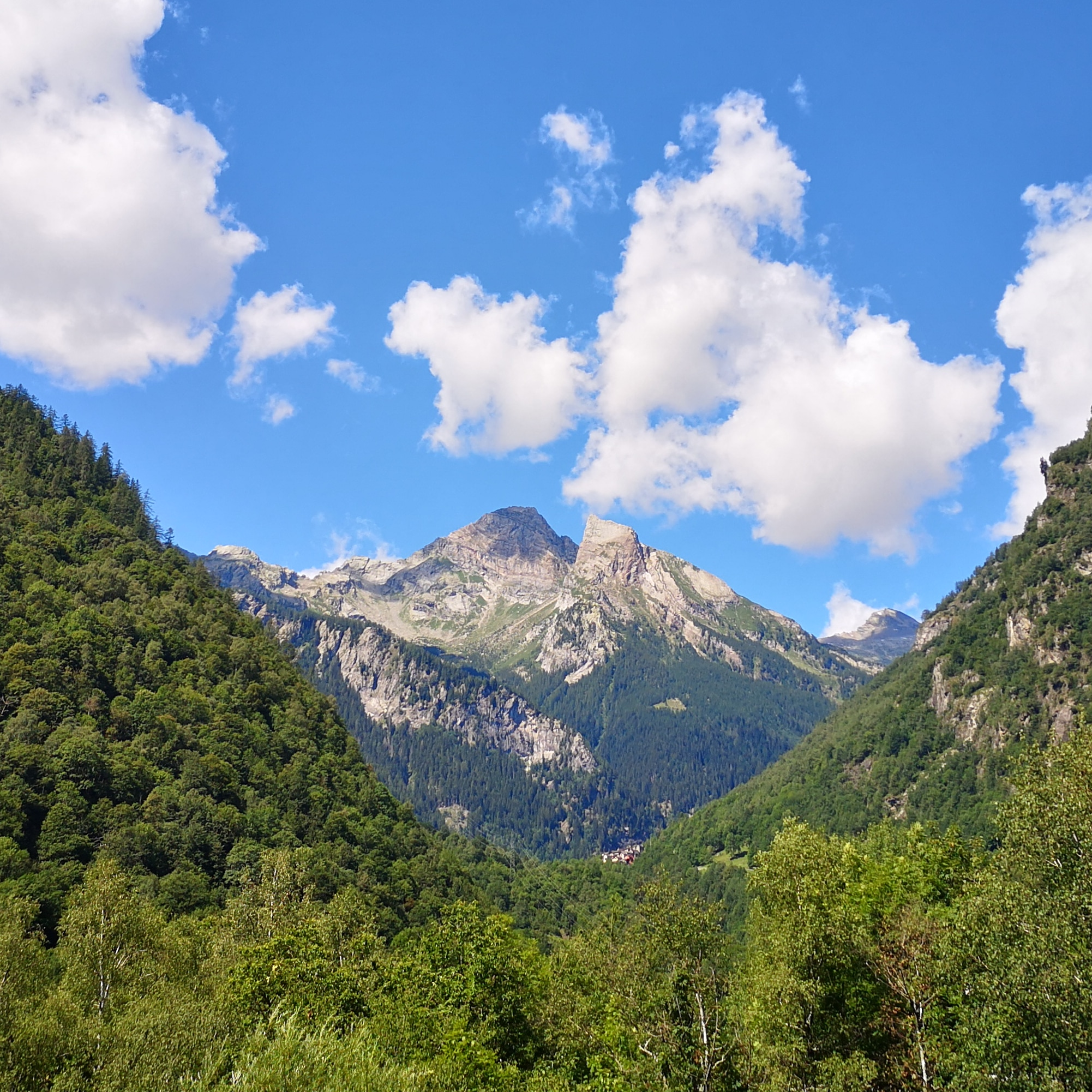
Cortignelli with Pizzo Castello and La Rossa

== History ==
Peccia is first mentioned in 1374 as Petia.

Peccia, together with Broglio, Fusio, Prato and Sornico were part of the comunità or valley community of Lavizzara until 1374. When the valley community broke up into separate villages, Peccia was the largest in the Lavizzara region. It included the settlement of Mogno and the Valle di Peccia, which was independent until 1669. The common, shared land of the four communities of Fusio, Peccia, Prato and Sornico (known as the comunella dei quattro comuni) remained shared until 1929.

The village was part of the parish of Sornico until 1613, after which the church of S. Antonio Abate in Peccia was elevated to become a parish church. The church was built in the 16th century. After the floods of 1834 and 1868, which destroyed some of the village, the church was totally rebuilt. The valley church of S. Carlo was built in 1617, and was raised to be the parish church in 1669.

At the beginning of the 20th century, most of the jobs in the village were in the extraction, processing (vessels and stone ovens) and trade in soapstone. Since 1946, white marble is also mined, which is the only marble quarry in Switzerland. In 1984, the presence of marble led to the creation of a sculpting school. This marble was used when the church of Mogno (a hamlet of Fusio) was rebuilt by Mario Botta, after the old church was destroyed by an avalanche in 1986.

At the beginning of the 21st century, manufacturing provides more than a third of the jobs in village. In 1950-56 largest hydroelectric power plants in Switzerland was built in the Valle di Peccia. It is fed by water from the catchment area of the Maggia river. In the last decades of the 20th century, the village invested in its tourist infrastructure.

== Geography ==
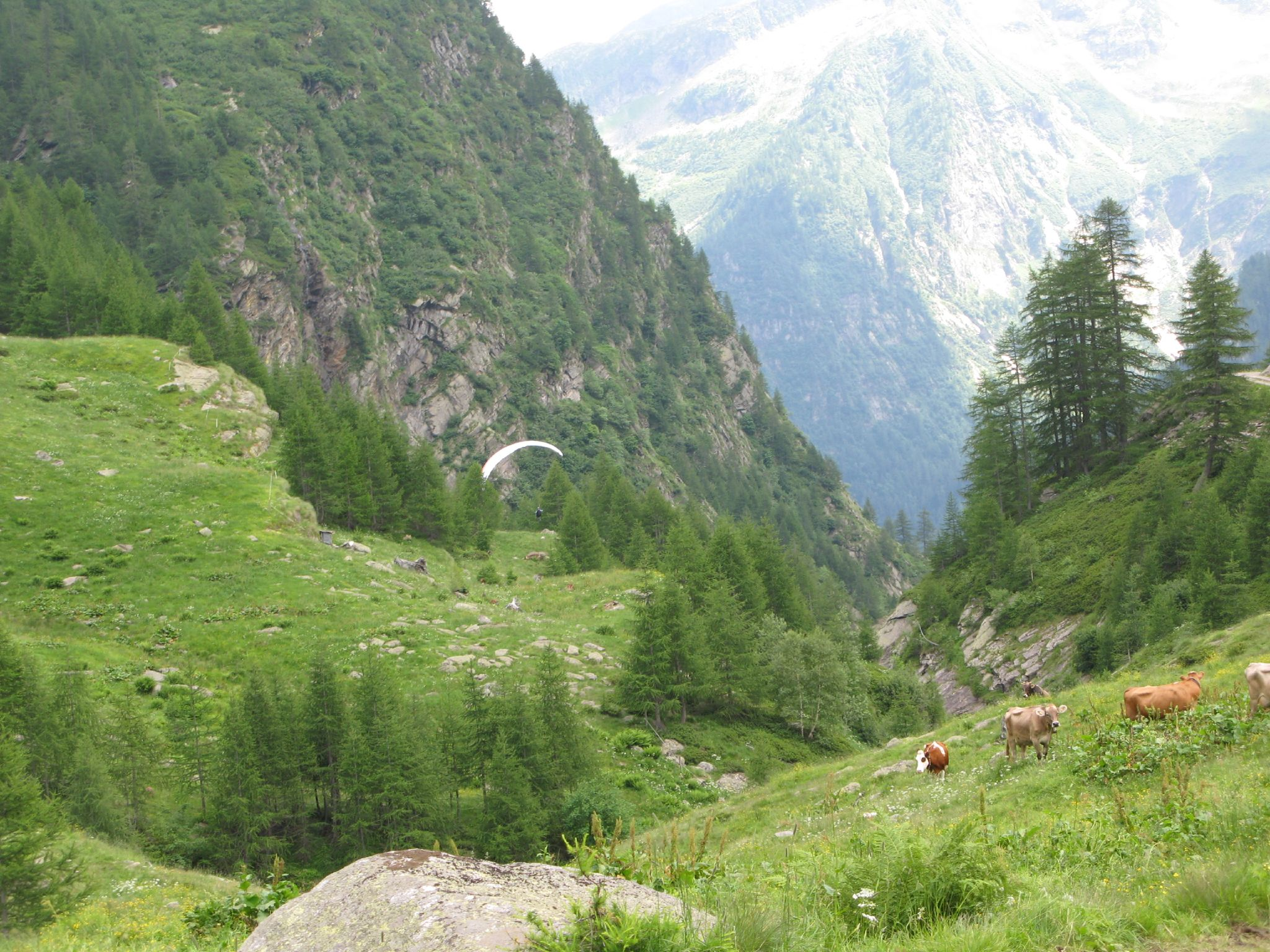
Peccia valley

Aerial view (1954)

Peccia has an area, as of 1997, of 54.26 square kilometers (20.95 sq mi). Of this area, 0.39 km^{2} (0.15 sq mi) or 0.7% is used for agricultural purposes, while 14.5 km^{2} (5.6 sq mi) or 26.7% is forested. Of the rest of the land, 0.48 km^{2} (0.19 sq mi) or 0.9% is settled (buildings or roads), 0.94 km^{2} (0.36 sq mi) or 1.7% is either rivers or lakes and 28.46 km^{2} (10.99 sq mi) or 52.5% is unproductive land.

Of the built up area, housing and buildings made up 0.2% and transportation infrastructure made up 0.3%. Out of the forested land, 16.8% of the total land area is heavily forested and 4.8% is covered with orchards or small clusters of trees. Of the agricultural land, 0.5% is used for growing crops. All the water in the municipality is flowing water. Of the unproductive areas, 21.0% is unproductive vegetation and 31.5% is too rocky for vegetation.

The village is located in the Vallemaggia district, about 39 km (24 mi) from Locarno. It consists of several settlements scattered throughout the Peccia valley. The main village is located at an elevation of 840 m (2,760 ft) in the Valle Maggia.

== Coat of arms ==
The blazon of the municipal coat of arms is Argent a fir tree issuant from a mount vert.

It is also a surname in Italy. For example, past mayor of Olevano sul Tusciano, was Luigi Peccia.

== Demographics ==
Peccia has a population (As of December 2000) of 171.

Most of the population (as of 2000) speaks Italian language (161 or 94.2%), with German being second most common (5 or 2.9%) and Portuguese being third (3 or 1.8%). There are 2 people who speak French and people who speak Romansh.

Of the population in the village, 104 or about 60.8% were born in Peccia and lived there in 2000. There were 38 or 22.2% who were born in the same canton, while 8 or 4.7% were born somewhere else in Switzerland, and 21 or 12.3% were born outside of Switzerland. As of 2000, there were 62 people who were single and never married in the village. There were 84 married individuals, 14 widows or widowers and 11 individuals who are divorced.

There were 12 households that consist of only one person and 7 households with five or more people. Out of a total of 65 households that answered this question, 18.5% were households made up of just one person and 4 were adults who lived with their parents. Of the rest of the households, there are 16 married couples without children, 22 married couples with children There were 6 single parents with a child or children. There were 4 households that were made up unrelated people and 1 household that was made some sort of institution or another collective housing.

In 2000 there were 144 single-family homes (or 91.7% of the total) out of a total of 157 inhabited buildings. There were 4 multi-family buildings (2.5%), along with multi-purpose buildings that were mostly used for housing (0.0%) and 9 other use buildings (commercial or industrial) that also had some housing (5.7%). Of the single-family homes 8 were built before 1919, while 4 were built between 1990 and 2000. The greatest number of single-family homes (93) were built between 1919 and 1945.

In 2000 there were 162 apartments in the village. The most common apartment size was 4 rooms of which there were 46. There were 10 single room apartments and 60 apartments with five or more rooms. Of these apartments, a total of 63 apartments (38.9% of the total) were permanently occupied, while 97 apartments (59.9%) were seasonally occupied and 2 apartments (1.2%) were empty.

The historical population is given in the following chart:

== Economy ==
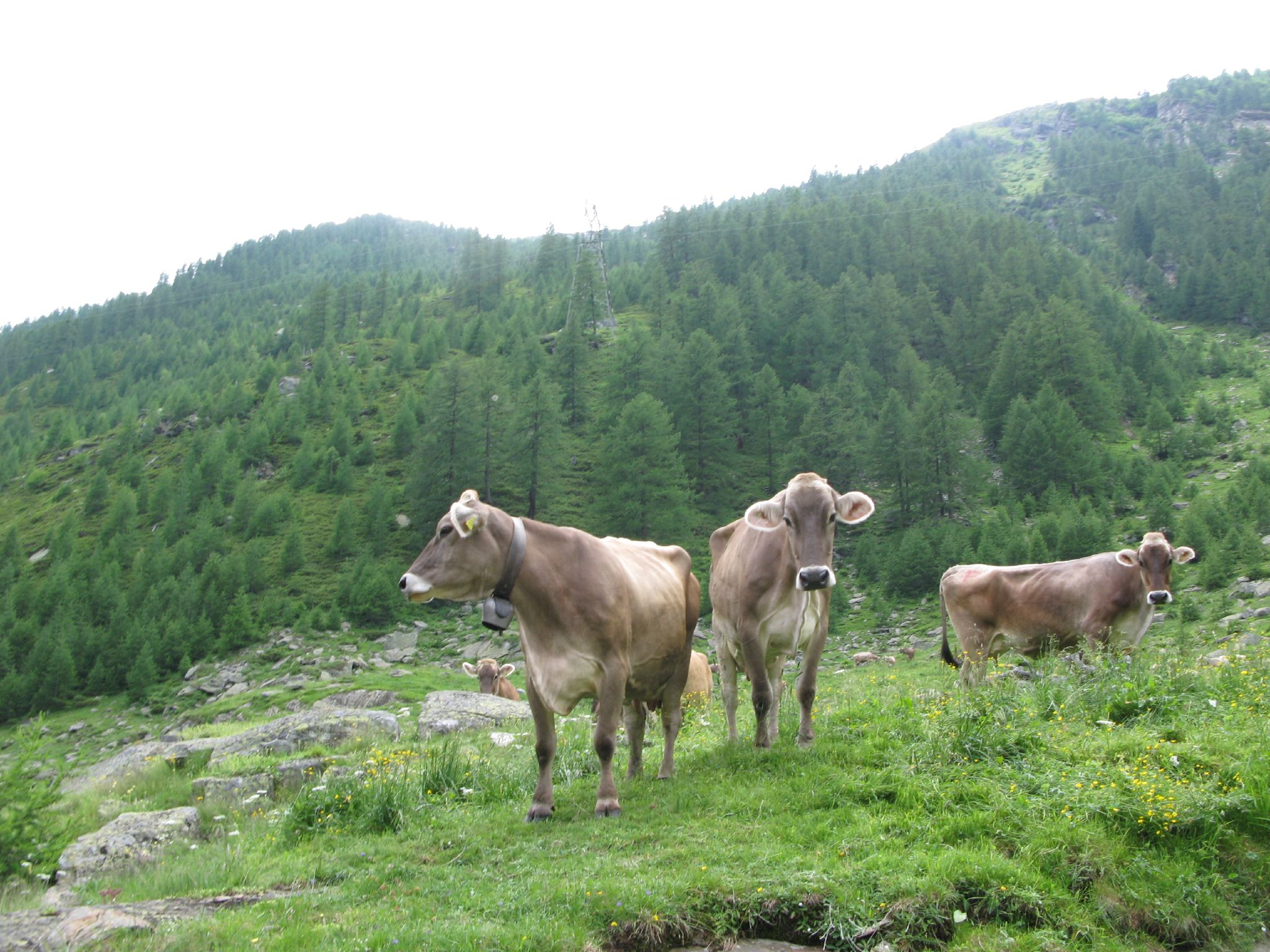
Cattle in the mountains above Peccia

There were 64 residents of the village who were employed in some capacity, of which females made up 23.4% of the workforce. In 2000, there were 26 workers who commuted into the village and 30 workers who commuted away. The village is a net exporter of workers, with about 1.2 workers leaving the village for every one entering.

== Religion ==
From the 2000 census, 159 or 93.0% were Roman Catholic, while 2 or 1.2% belonged to the Swiss Reformed Church. Of the rest of the population, there were 3 individuals (or about 1.75% of the population) who belonged to the Christian Catholic Church. There were 2 (or about 1.17% of the population) who belonged to no church, are agnostic or atheist, and 5 individuals (or about 2.92% of the population) did not answer the question.

== Education ==
In Peccia about 71 or (41.5%) of the population have completed non-mandatory upper secondary education, and 7 or (4.1%) have completed additional higher education (either University or a Fachhochschule). Of the 7 who completed tertiary schooling, 71.4% were Swiss men, 28.6% were Swiss women.

As of 2000, there were 10 students in Peccia who came from another village, while 17 residents attended schools outside the village.
