= Bätershausen =

Coordinates: 47°37′51″N 9°9′59″E

Bätershausen is a village in the district of Kreuzlingen in the canton of Thurgau, Switzerland.

It was first recorded in 1291 as Berhtershusen.

Bätershausen is located in the former municipality of Dippishausen-Oftershausen. In 1984 Dippishausen-Oftershausen municipality was incorporated into its neighboring municipality of Siegershausen, which in turn merged with its neighbors in 1996 to form a new and larger municipality of Kemmental.
