= Oftershausen =

- Village
- Location in Switzerland
- Coordinates: 47°36′52″N 9°10′9″E
- Country: Switzerland
- Municipality: Kemmental
- First recorded: 1275 (as Oftershusen)

Oftershausen is a village in the district of Kreuzlingen in the canton of Thurgau, Switzerland.

It was first recorded in 1275 as Oftershusen.

Oftershausen is located in the former municipality Dippishausen-Oftershausen. In 1984 Dippishausen-Oftershausen municipality was incorporated into its neighboring municipality Siegershausen, which in turn merged with its neighbors in 1996 to form a new and larger municipality Kemmental.

Oftershausen was also the name of the municipality Dippishausen-Oftershausen before 1900.
