= Dippishausen =

Village in Kreuzlingen, Thurgau, Switzerland

Coordinates: 47°37′7″N 9°10′8″E

Dippishausen is a village in the district of Kreuzlingen in the canton of Thurgau, Switzerland.

It was first recorded in 1192 as Tibinshusen.

Dippishausen is located in the former municipality Dippishausen-Oftershausen. In 1984 Dippishausen-Oftershausen municipality was incorporated into its neighboring municipality Siegershausen, which in turn merged with its neighbors in 1996 to form a new and larger municipality Kemmental.

Dippishausen was also the name of the municipality Dippishausen-Oftershausen from 1900 through 1952.
