= Bachi (disambiguation) =

Bachi are wooden sticks used for Japanese percussion instruments.

Bachi may also refer to:

- Bächi, a village in Switzerland
- Bachi (film), a 2000 Indian Telugu-language film
- A French Navy sailor cap
- A nickname for the USS Suribachi (AE-21)
