= Dippishausen-Oftershausen =

Coordinates: 47°36′57″N 9°10′8″E

Dippishausen-Oftershausen is a former municipality in the canton of Thurgau, Switzerland.

The municipality contained the villages Dippishausen, Oftershausen and Bätershausen. It was named just Oftershausen until 1900, when it changed its name to just Dippishausen. In 1953 the name Dippishausen-Oftershausen was created.

The municipality had 140 inhabitants in 1850. It decreased to 118 in 1900 before returning to 140 in 1950, but in 1980 it was down again, to 121.

In 1984 the municipality was incorporated into the neighboring municipality Siegershausen. In 1996, Siegershausen was in turn merged with other neighboring municipalities; Dippishausen and Oftershausen is now a part of the larger municipality Kemmental.
