= Siegershausen railway station =

Train station in Switzerland

Siegershausen
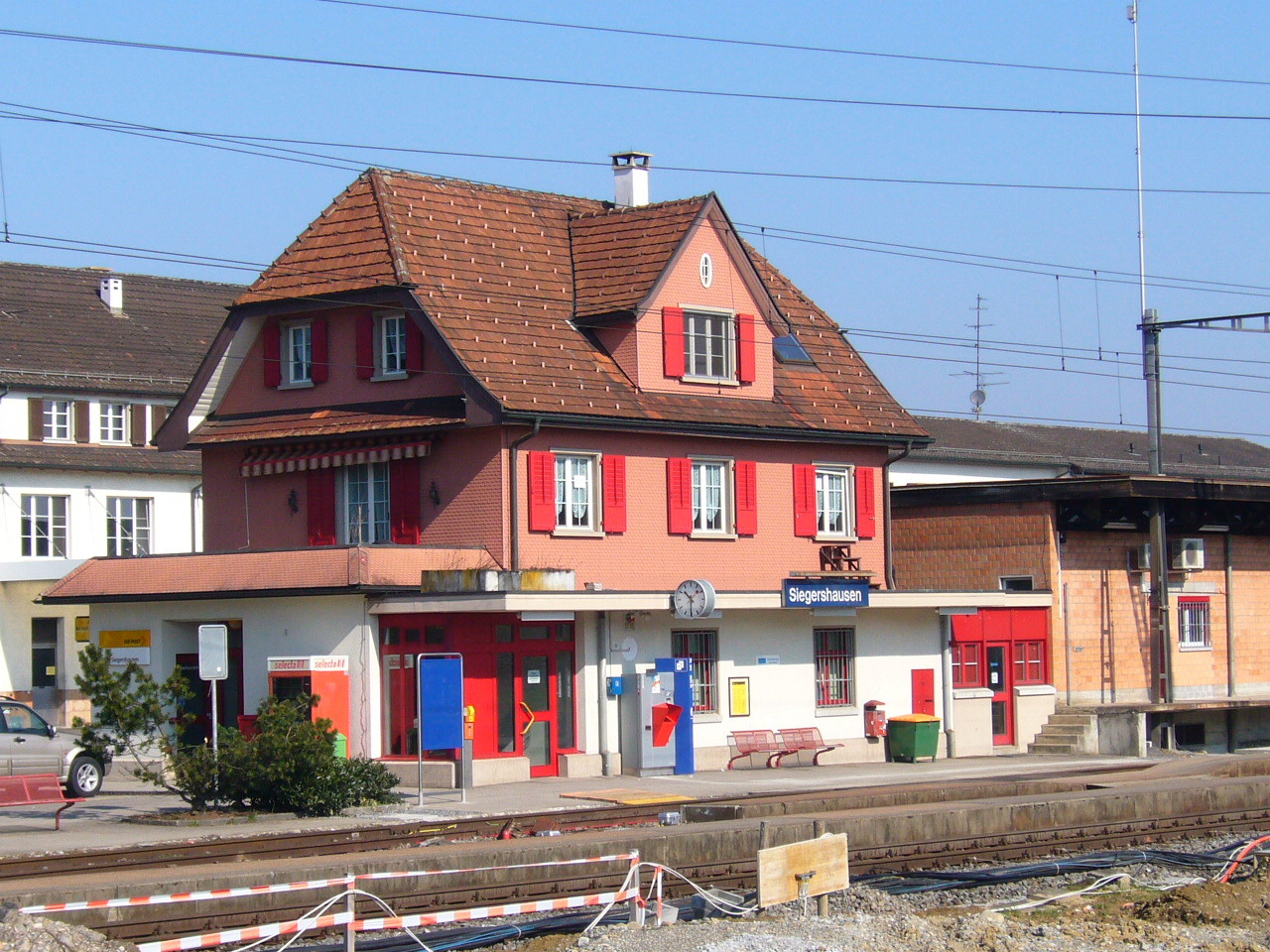
- The station building in 2006

General information
- Location: Kemmental; Switzerland
- Coordinates: 47°36′40″N 9°10′05″E
- Elevation: 546 m (1,791 ft)
- Owner: Thurbo
- Line: Wil–Kreuzlingen
- Distance: 30.8 km (19.1 mi) from Wil
- Train operators: Thurbo

Other information
- Fare zone: 257 (Tarifverbund Ostwind)

Passengers
- 2018: 130 per weekday

Services
Preceding station	St. Gallen S-Bahn	Following station
Berg towards Weinfelden	S14	Lengwil towards Konstanz
Berg towards Weinfelden	SN14 Limited service	Lengwil towards Konstanz
Location
- Location within Switzerland Location within Canton of Thurgau

Siegershausen railway station (German: Bahnhof Siegershausen) is a railway station in the village of Siegershausen, within the municipality of Kemmental, in the Swiss canton of Thurgau. It is an intermediate stop on the standard gauge Wil–Kreuzlingen line of Thurbo, and is served as a request stop by local trains only.

== Services ==
The following services stop at Siegershausen:

- St. Gallen S-Bahn S14: half-hourly service between Weinfelden and Konstanz, via Kreuzlingen.

During weekends, the station is served by a nighttime S-Bahn service (SN14), offered by Ostwind tariff network, and operated by Thurbo for St. Gallen S-Bahn.

- St. Gallen S-Bahn SN14: hourly service to Weinfelden and to Konstanz, via Kreuzlingen.

== See also ==
- Bodensee S-Bahn
- Rail transport in Switzerland
