= Geboltschhusen =

Village in the canton of Thurgau, Switzerland

Coordinates: 47°37′13″N 9°8′37″E

- Village
- Location within Switzerland
- Canton: Thurgau
- First Recorded: 1385

Geboltschhusen is a village in the canton of Thurgau, Switzerland.

It was first recorded in year 1385 as Geboltzhusen.

Geboltschhusen is located in the former municipality Ellighausen. In 1996 Ellighausen municipality merged with its neighbors to form a new and larger municipality Kemmental.
