= Bommen =

Coordinates: 47.6166°N 9.1543°E

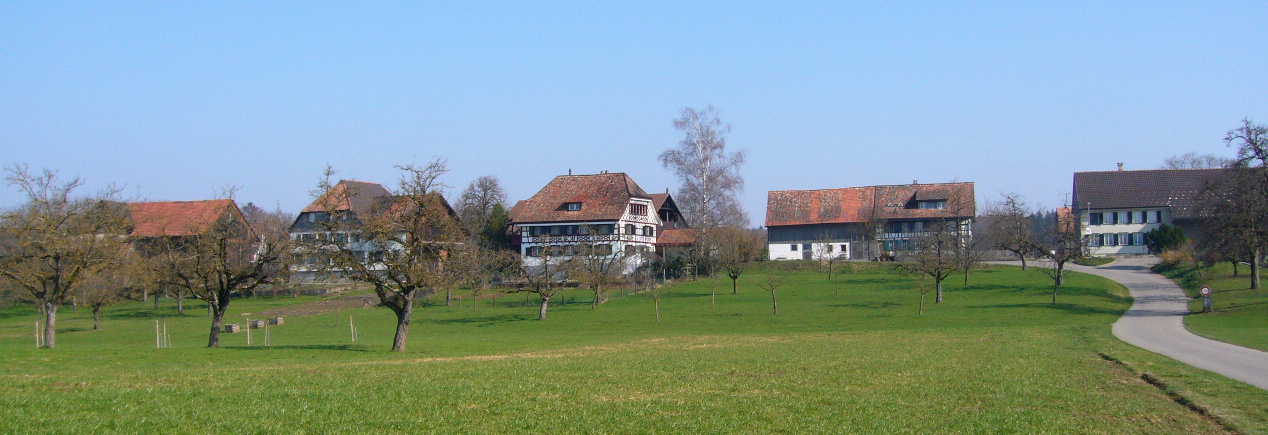

Bommen is a village in the canton of Thurgau, Switzerland. It was first recorded in year 1348 as Boumen. Bommer Weiher is located north of the village.

Bommen is located in the former municipality Alterswilen. In 1996 Alterswilen municipality merged with its neighbor to form a new and larger municipality Kemmental.
