= Schwaderloh =

Village in Thurgau, Switzerland

Coordinates: 47°37′23.73″N 9°08′27.69″E

Schwaderloh is a village in the canton of Thurgau, Switzerland.

In 1499, it was the site of the Battle of Schwaderloh as a part of the Swabian War.

Schwaderloh is located in the former municipality Neuwilen. In 1996, Neuwilen municipality merged with its neighbors to form a new and larger municipality, Kemmental.
