= Bommer Weiher =

Lake in Thurgau, Switzerland

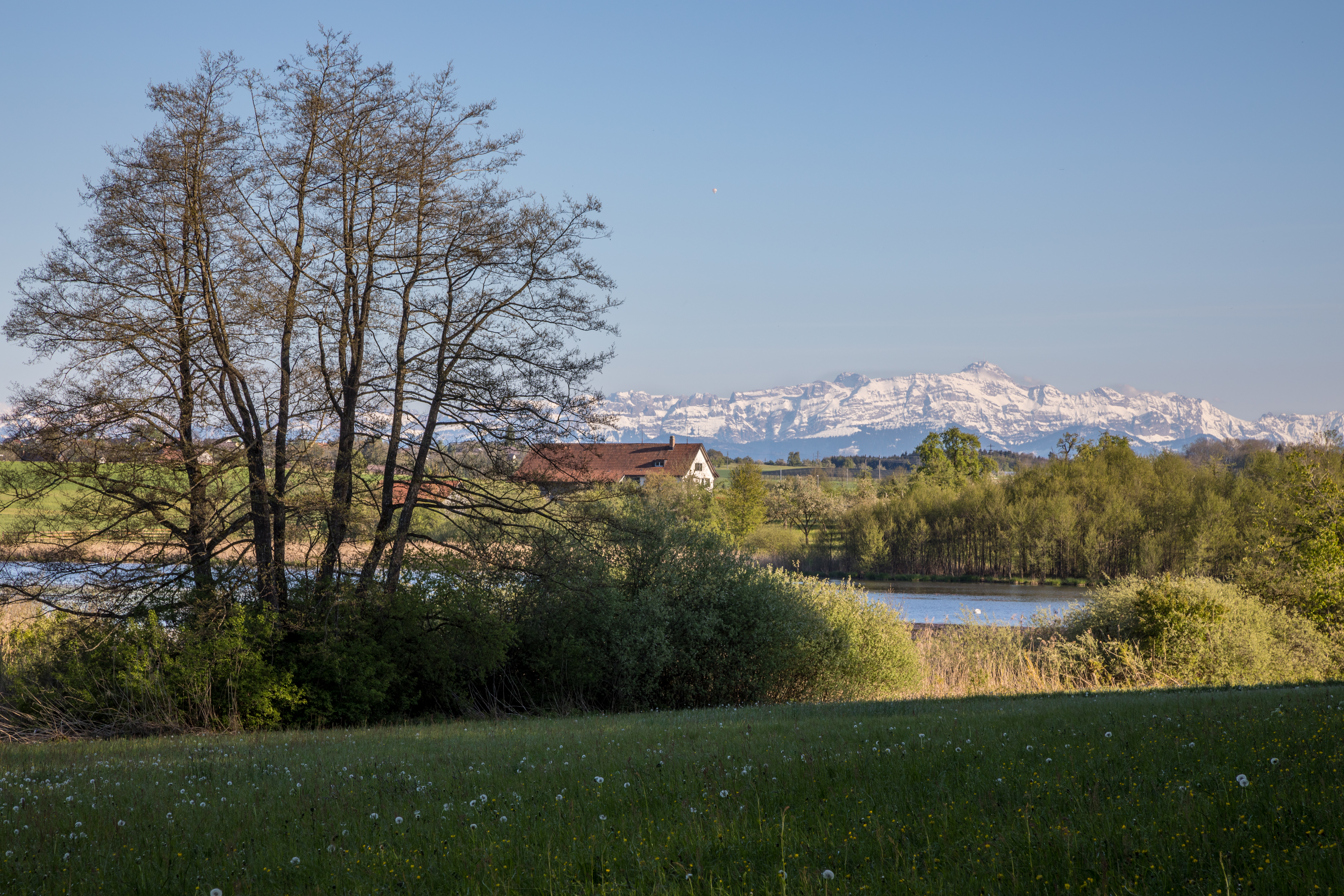

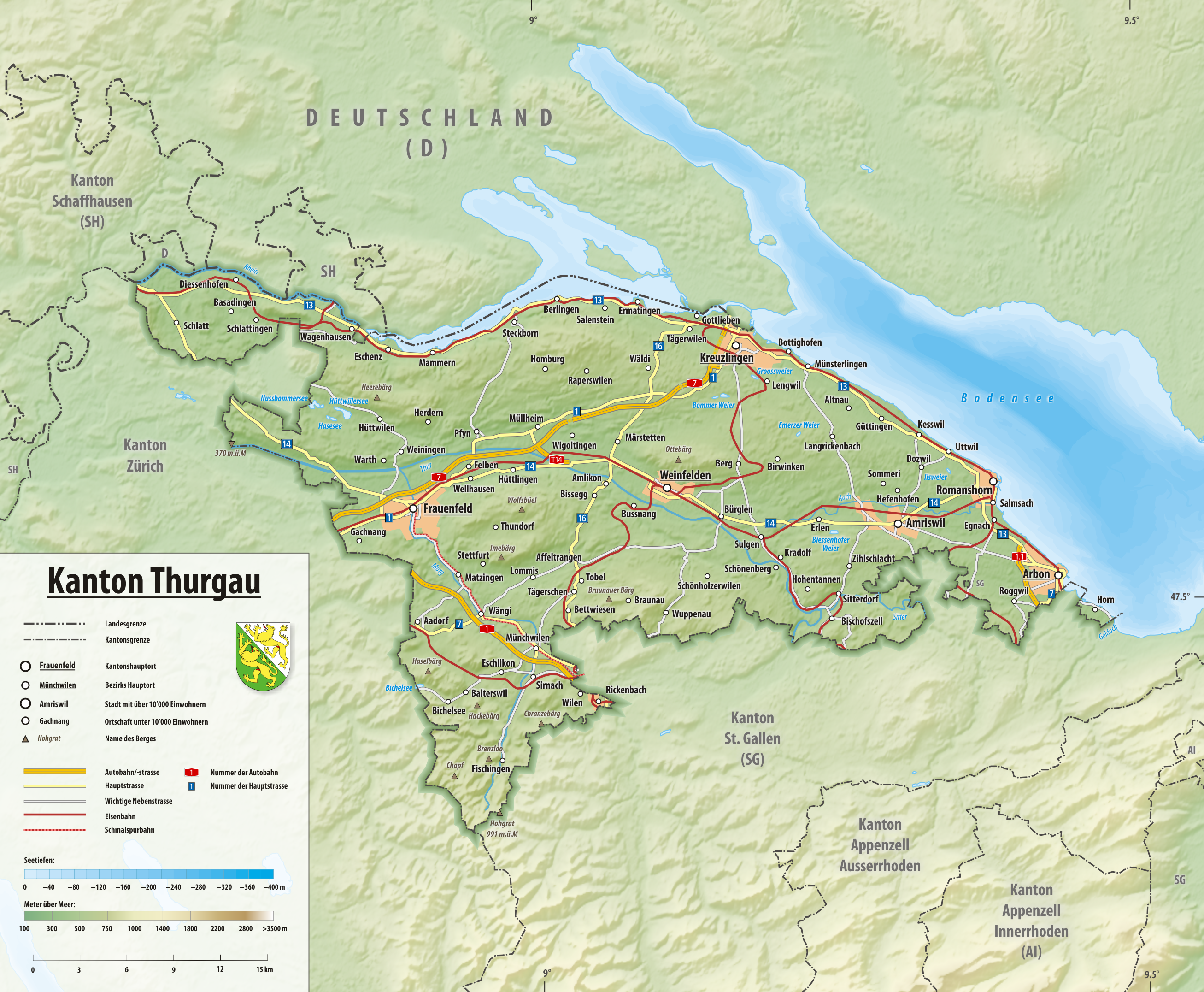
- Location within Canton of Thurgau Location within Switzerland Location within Alps
- Interactive map of Bommer Weiher
- Location: Kemmental, Thurgau
- Coordinates: 47°37′07″N 9°9′18″E
- Basin countries: Switzerland
- Surface area: 15 ha (37 acres)
- Surface elevation: 530 m (1,740 ft)

The Bommer Weiher are a series of fish ponds near Alterswilen in the municipality of Kemmental, Canton of Thurgau, Switzerland. Their surface area is about 0.15 km^{2}.
