= Hugelshofen =

Village and former municipality in Switzerland

Coordinates: 47°35′55.50″N 9°06′59.39″E

Hugelshofen is a village and former municipality in the canton of Thurgau, Switzerland.

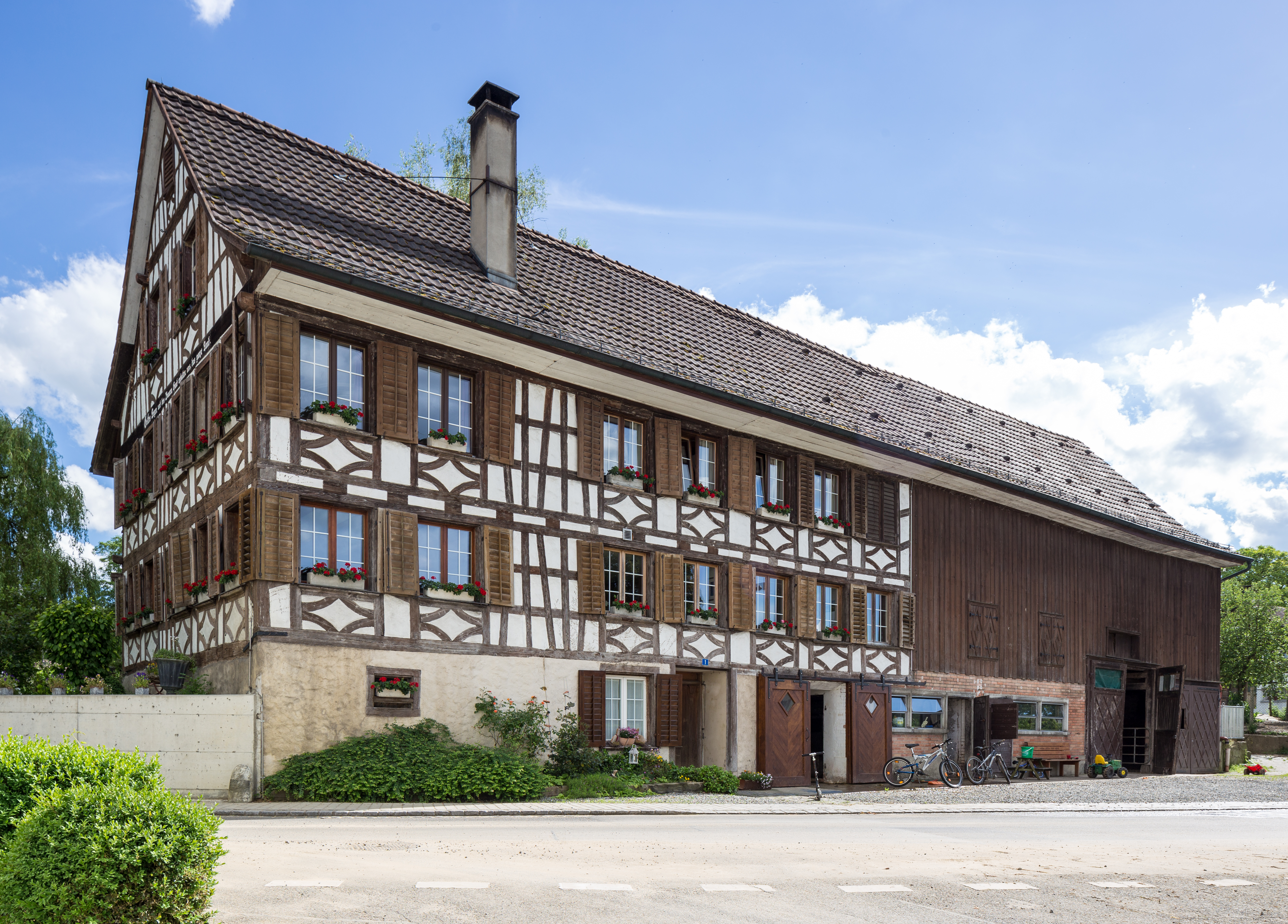
Timber framed farm house in Hugelshofen

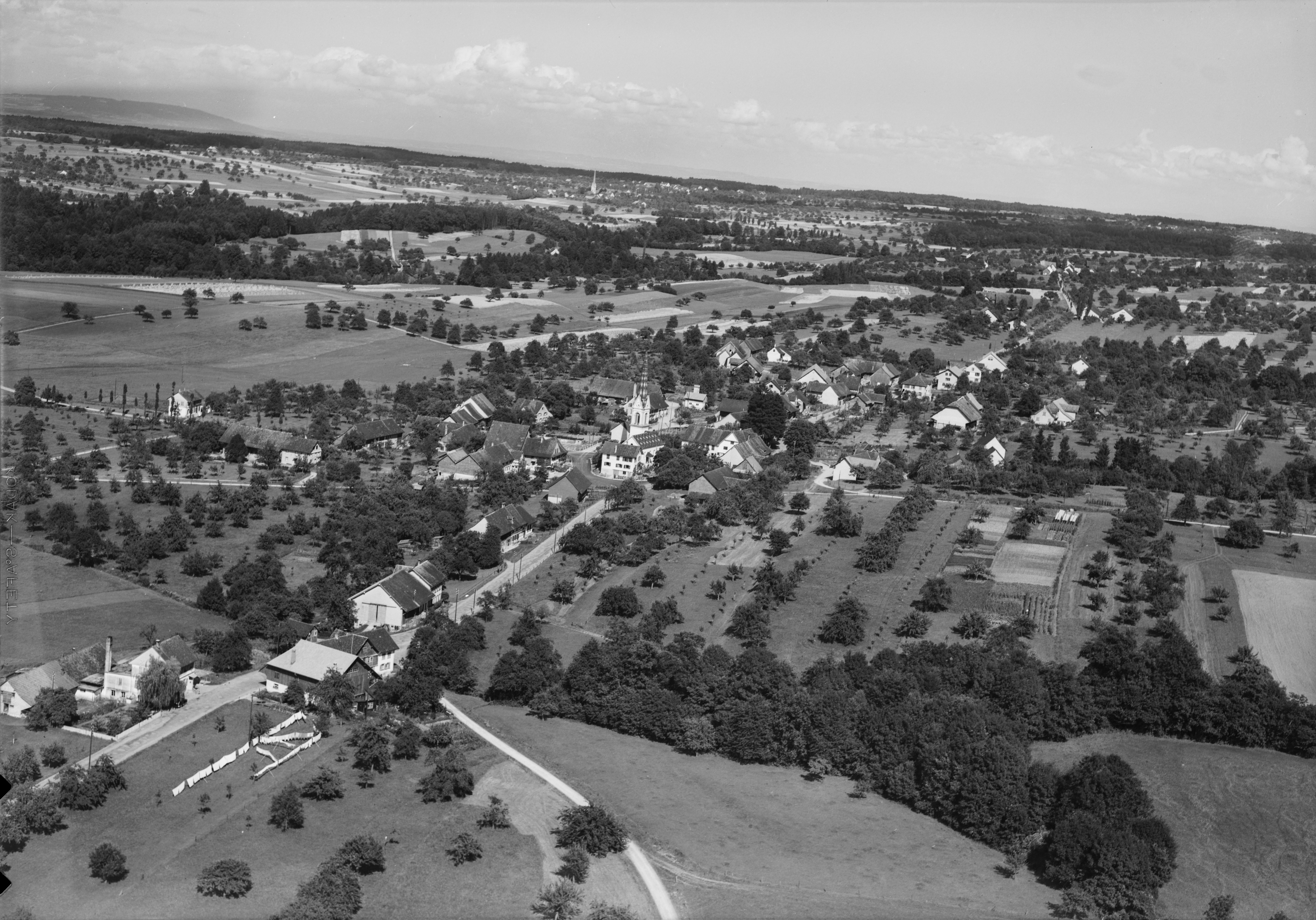
Aerial view (1954)

It was first recorded in year 1176 as Hugolteshouen.

The municipality had 442 inhabitants in 1850, which decreased to 360 in 1900, 359 in 1950 and 325 in 1990.

In 1996 the municipality was merged with the other, neighboring municipalities Alterswilen, Altishausen, Dotnacht, Ellighausen, Lippoldswilen, Neuwilen and Siegershausen to form a new and larger municipality Kemmental.
