= Berg, Thurgau =

Berg
- Municipality
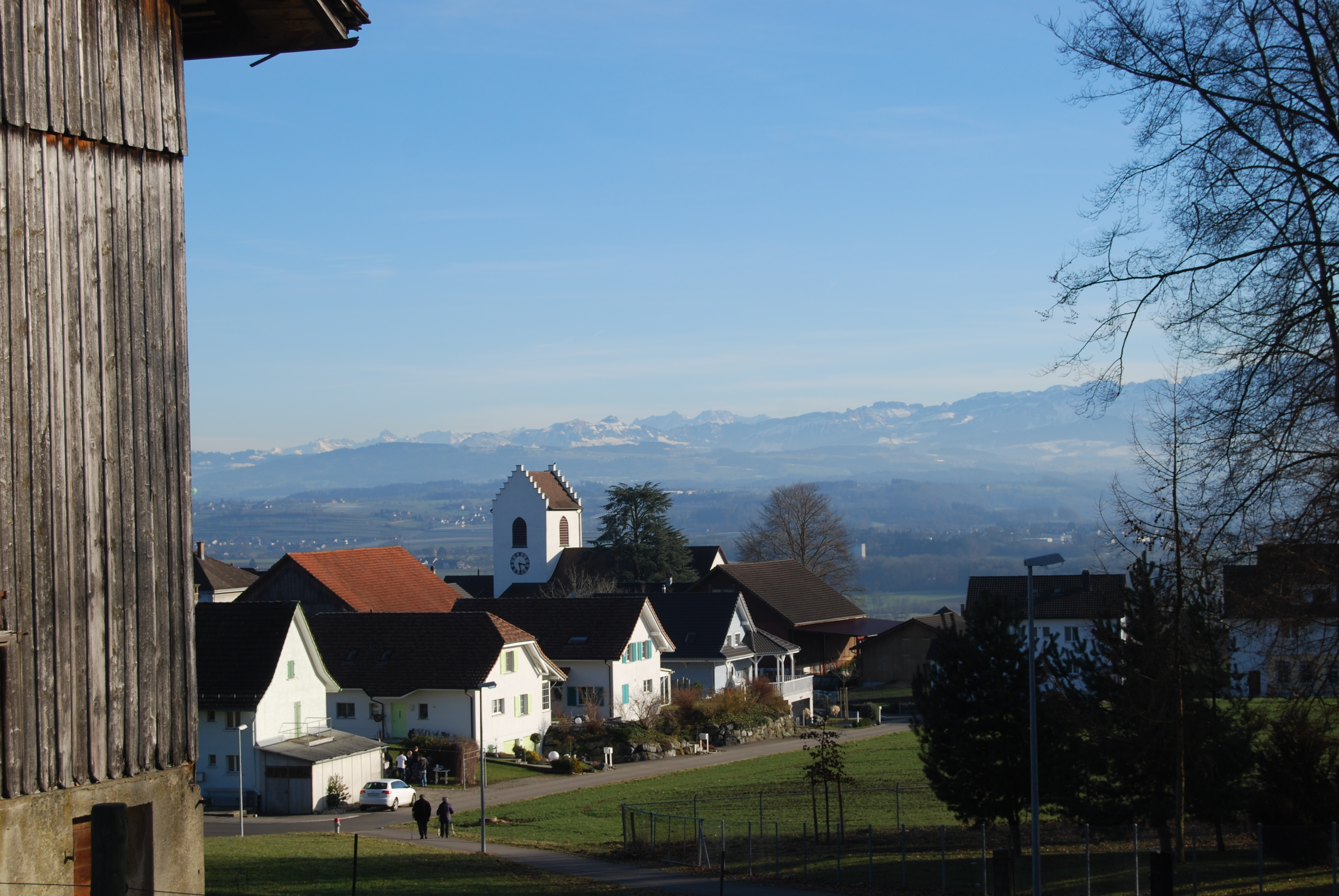

- Coat of arms
- Location of Berg
- Location within Switzerland Location within Canton of Thurgau
- Coordinates: 47°34′N 9°10′E
- Country: Switzerland
- Canton: Thurgau
- District: Weinfelden

Area
  - Total: 13.1 km^{2} (5.1 sq mi)
- Elevation: 540 m (1,770 ft)

Population (December 2007)
  - Total: 3,058
  - Density: 233/km^{2} (605/sq mi)
- Time zone: UTC+01:00 (CET)
  - Summer (DST): UTC+02:00 (CEST)
- Postal code: 8572
- SFOS number: 4891
- ISO 3166 code: CH-TG
- Surrounded by: Birwinken, Bürglen, Kemmental, Lengwil, Weinfelden
- Website: www.berg-tg.ch

Berg (Swiss Standard German pronunciation: [bɛrɡ]) is a municipality in the district of Weinfelden in the canton of Thurgau, Switzerland.

== History ==
The earliest traces of human settlement come from the Stone Age and there are scattered Bronze Age items around Berg. The modern village of Berg is first mentioned in 796 as Berga. In the Early Middle Ages, Berg and the surrounding land were in the possession of the Bishop of Constance and were on the southern border of the Bishop's land. A fortress was first built in the 12th–13th century, which was replaced in 1600 by a castle. The castle and the rights to rule over the villages of Berg, Andhausen, Donzhausen and parts of Andwil (TG), Mauren and Mattwil were rented out by the Cathedral of Constance (not the Bishop) until 1798. The circumstances behind the removal of the diocese's administration and the emergence of the court in 1386 are unclear. Some of the owners of the village included Egli von Zug (1518–67), Brümsi von Herblingen (1586-1653/56) and the von Thurn-Valsassina family (1676–1798).

The village chapel was probably built in the 11th century. In 1506 a benefice was donated, so that a chaplain could be supported in the village. The chapel remained a filial church of Sulgen. During the Protestant Reformation in 1529, the village converted to the new religion, while the court and ruler remained Catholic. Due to the religious tension, regular church services were not held in Berg until 1575. Until the founding of the Reformed parish in 1851, Berg was part of the parish of Sulgen. In 16th and 17th centuries, the Catholic parish also included Altishausen, Birwinken, Dotnacht, Graltshausen, Guntershausen, Hugelshofen and Mattwil. In 1935, the church stopped being a shared church and a Catholic church was built.

The majority of the local economy was made up of fruit production along with a distillery, livestock (in 1899 a municipal dairy was built) and until 1900 vineyards. As a result of industrialization, in about 1865, the Brauchli brickyard was built. This was followed in 1900 by several embroidery companies. In 1911, the village was connected to the Mittel-Thurgau-Bahn rail line through stations at Kehlhof and Berg. More recently, a favorable tax rate and an attractive location, have led to strong population growth and development of new residential areas. In 1990 about 45% of the workers in Berg, worked in the manufacturing and services sectors.

== Geography ==
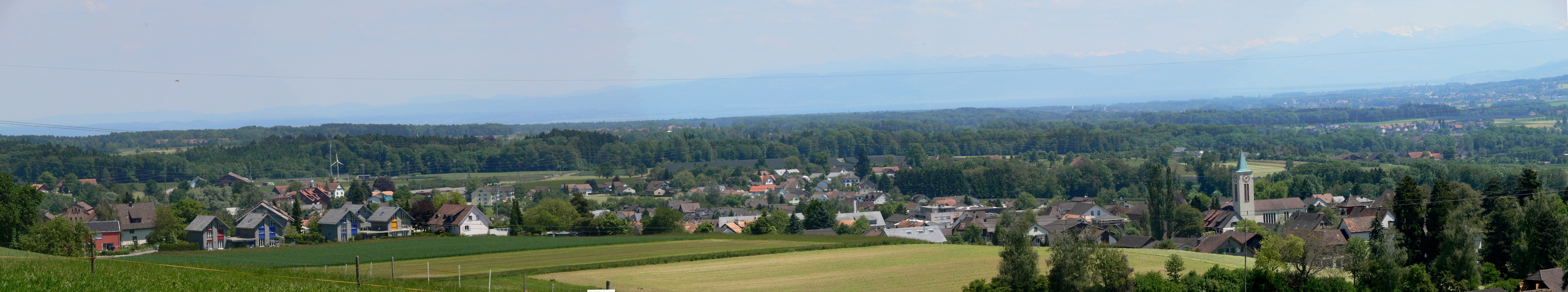
A panorama of Berg

Berg has an area, as of 2009, of 13.09 square kilometers (5.05 sq mi). Of this area, 9.37 km^{2} (3.62 sq mi) or 71.6% is used for agricultural purposes, while 2.22 km^{2} (0.86 sq mi) or 17.0% is forested. Of the rest of the land, 1.48 km^{2} (0.57 sq mi) or 11.3% is settled (buildings or roads), 0.04 km^{2} (9.9 acres) or 0.3% is either rivers or lakes and 0.02 km^{2} (4.9 acres) or 0.2% is unproductive land.

Of the built up area, industrial buildings made up 6.2% of the total area while housing and buildings made up 0.4% and transportation infrastructure made up 0.5%. while parks, green belts and sports fields made up 4.0%. Out of the forested land, 15.7% of the total land area is heavily forested and 1.3% is covered with orchards or small clusters of trees. Of the agricultural land, 56.5% is used for growing crops, while 15.0% is used for orchards or vine crops. All the water in the municipality is flowing water.

The municipality is located in the Weinfelden district. It consists of the villages of Berg, Andhausen, Graltshausen, Mauren, Birwinken and Guntershausen bei Birwinken (now Guntershausen bei Berg) and the hamlet of Beggelschwilen.

== Demographics ==
Berg has a population (as of December 2020) of 3,429. As of 2008, 10.0% of the population are foreign nationals. Over the last 10 years (1997–2007) the population has changed at a rate of 11.5%. Most of the population (as of 2000) speaks German (94.1%), with Serbo-Croatian being second most common ( 1.8%) and Albanian being third ( 1.0%).

As of 2008, the gender distribution of the population was 50.6% male and 49.4% female. The population was made up of 1,368 Swiss men (45.0% of the population), and 168 (5.5%) non-Swiss men. There were 1,366 Swiss women (45.0%), and 136 (4.5%) non-Swiss women.

In 2008 there were 19 live births to Swiss citizens and 1 birth to non-Swiss citizens, and in same time span there were 14 deaths of Swiss citizens and 2 non-Swiss citizen deaths. Ignoring immigration and emigration, the population of Swiss citizens increased by 5 while the foreign population decreased by 1. There were 1 Swiss woman who emigrated from Switzerland to another country, 12 non-Swiss men who emigrated from Switzerland to another country and 7 non-Swiss women who emigrated from Switzerland to another country. The total Swiss population change in 2008 (from all sources) was a decrease of 33 and the non-Swiss population change was an increase of 5 people. This represents a population growth rate of −0.9%.

The age distribution, as of 2009, in Berg is; 340 children or 11.1% of the population are between 0 and 9 years old and 461 teenagers or 15.1% are between 10 and 19. Of the adult population, 340 people or 11.1% of the population are between 20 and 29 years old. 362 people or 11.9% are between 30 and 39, 561 people or 18.4% are between 40 and 49, and 395 people or 13.0% are between 50 and 59. The senior population distribution is 297 people or 9.7% of the population are between 60 and 69 years old, 174 people or 5.7% are between 70 and 79, there are 106 people or 3.5% who are between 80 and 89, and there are 14 people or 0.5% who are 90 and older.

As of 2000, there were 1,053 private households in the municipality, and an average of 2.6 persons per household. In 2000 there were 487 single family homes (or 83.8% of the total) out of a total of 581 inhabited buildings. There were 46 two family buildings (7.9%), 18 three family buildings (3.1%) and 30 multi-family buildings (or 5.2%). There were 591 (or 20.5%) persons who were part of a couple without children, and 1,615 (or 56.2%) who were part of a couple with children. There were 173 (or 6.0%) people who lived in single parent home, while there are 23 persons who were adult children living with one or both parents, 21 persons who lived in a household made up of relatives, 14 who lived in a household made up of unrelated persons, and 148 who are either institutionalized or live in another type of collective housing.

The vacancy rate for the municipality, in 2008, was 2.28%. As of 2007, the construction rate of new housing units was 4.6 new units per 1000 residents. In 2000 there were 1,139 apartments in the municipality. The most common apartment size was the 6 room apartment of which there were 288. There were 39 single room apartments and 288 apartments with six or more rooms.

In the 2007 federal election the most popular party was the SVP which received 43.48% of the vote. The next three most popular parties were the CVP (15.9%), the FDP (13.94%) and the Green Party (8.73%). In the federal election, a total of 1,078 votes were cast, and the voter turnout was 51.6%.

The historical population is given in the following table:

year	population
1850	440
1910	833
1950	795
1980	1,142
1990	1,575
2000	2,876

== Sights ==
The hamlets of Hard and Kehlhof are designated as part of the Inventory of Swiss Heritage Sites.

== Economy ==
As of 2007, Berg had an unemployment rate of 1.37%. As of 2005, there were 175 people employed in the primary economic sector and about 55 businesses involved in this sector. 473 people are employed in the secondary sector and there are 43 businesses in this sector. 933 people are employed in the tertiary sector, with 108 businesses in this sector.

In 2000 there were 1,922 workers who lived in the municipality. Of these, 903 or about 47.0% of the residents worked outside Berg while 694 people commuted into the municipality for work. There were a total of 1,713 jobs (of at least 6 hours per week) in the municipality. Of the working population, 7.1% used public transportation to get to work, and 54.1% used a private car.

== Religion ==
From the 2000 census, 785 or 27.3% were Roman Catholic, while 1,575 or 54.8% belonged to the Swiss Reformed Church. Of the rest of the population, there were 3 Old Catholics (or about 0.10% of the population) who belonged to the Christian Catholic Church of Switzerland there are 43 individuals (or about 1.50% of the population) who belong to the Orthodox Church, and there are 109 individuals (or about 3.79% of the population) who belong to another Christian church. There was 1 individual who was Jewish, and 69 (or about 2.40% of the population) who are Islamic. There are 6 individuals (or about 0.21% of the population) who belong to another church (not listed on the census), 228 (or about 7.93% of the population) belong to no church, are agnostic or atheist, and 57 individuals (or about 1.98% of the population) did not answer the question.

== Transport ==
Berg sits on the Wil–Kreuzlingen line between Weinfelden and Kreuzlingen and is served by the St. Gallen S-Bahn at Berg and Kehlhof.

== Education ==
The entire Swiss population is generally well educated. In Berg about 78.5% of the population (between age 25 and 64) have completed either non-mandatory upper secondary education or additional higher education (either university or a Fachhochschule).

Berg is home to the Berg-Birwinken primary and secondary school district. In the 2008/2009 school year there were 471 students at either the primary or secondary levels. There were 102 children in the kindergarten, and the average class size was 20.4 kindergartners. Of the children in kindergarten, 55 or 53.9% were female, 11 or 10.8% were not Swiss citizens and 6 or 5.9% did not speak German natively. The lower and upper primary levels begin at about age 5–6 and last for 6 years. There were 160 children in who were at the lower primary level and 152 children in the upper primary level. The average class size in the primary school was 21.29 students. At the lower primary level, there were 77 children or 48.1% of the total population who were female, 15 or 9.4% were not Swiss citizens and 10 or 6.3% did not speak German natively. In the upper primary level, there were 71 or 46.7% who were female, 13 or 8.6% were not Swiss citizens and 5 or 3.3% did not speak German natively.

At the secondary level, students are divided according to performance. The secondary level begins at about age 12 and usually lasts 3 years. There were 102 teenagers who were in the advanced school, of which 55 or 53.9% were female, 3 or 2.9% were not Swiss citizens. There were 57 teenagers who were in the standard school, of which 26 or 45.6% were female, 5 or 8.8% were not Swiss citizens and 4 or 7.0% did not speak German natively. The average class size for all classes at the secondary level was 17.67 students.

== Notable residents ==
- Anita Buri, Miss Switzerland 1999, grew up in Berg TG.
- Ernst Leumann, Indologist known for research into Jainism and languages of Turkestan, born in Berg TG.
