= Lippoldswilen =

Former municipality of Switzerland

Coordinates: 47°36′40″N 9°6′42″E

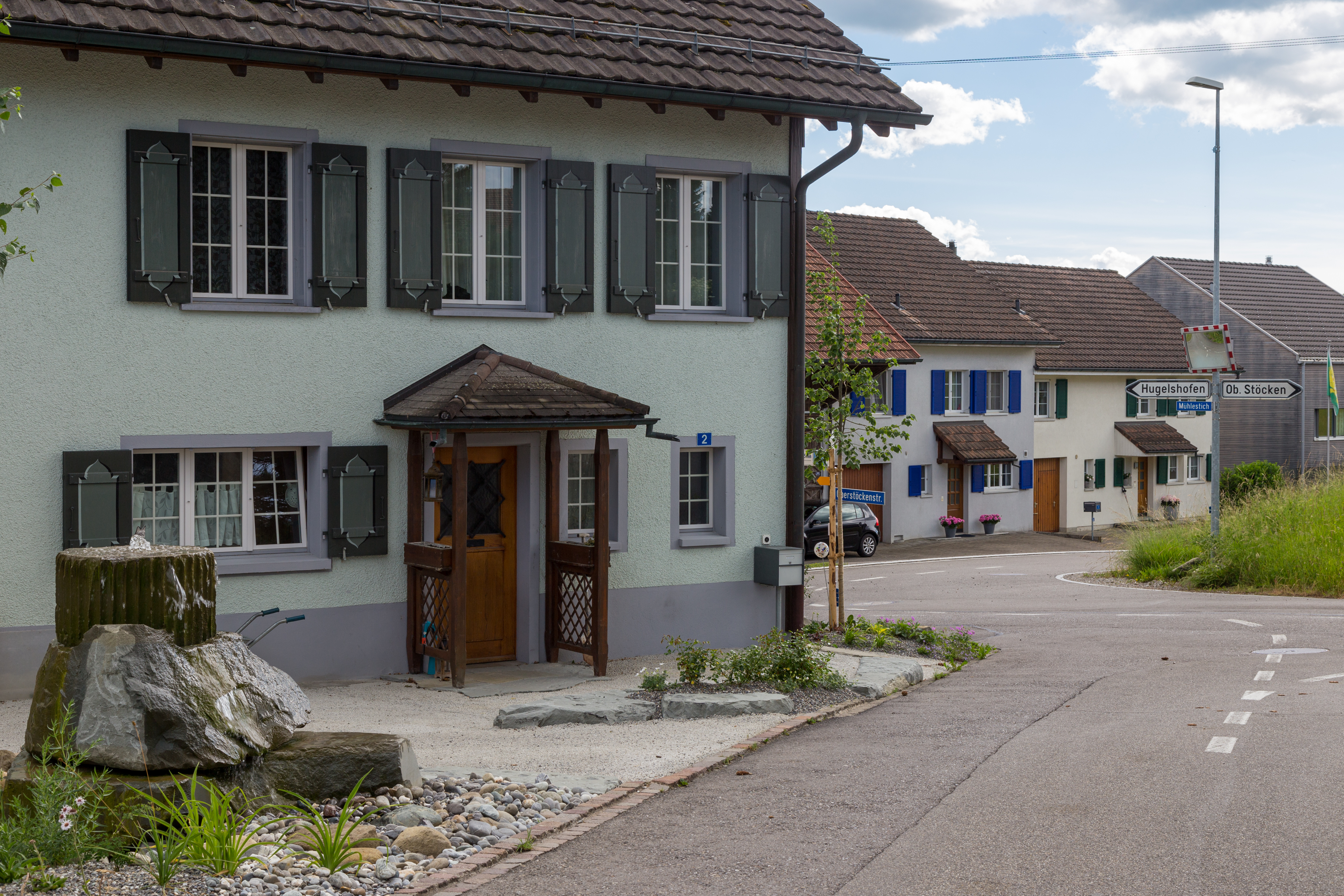
Crossing in Lippoldswilen

Lippoldswilen is a village and former municipality in the canton of Thurgau, Switzerland.

It was first recorded in the year 1303 as Lupoltwile.

The municipality also contained the village Unterstöcken as well as six other hamlets. It had 153 inhabitants in 1850, which remained stable with 154 in 1900, but then decreased to 138 in 1950 and 97 in 1990. At the end of 2025, the population was 176.

In 1996, the municipality was merged with other neighboring municipalities including Alterswilen, Altishausen, Dotnacht, Ellighausen, Hugelshofen, Neuwilen and Siegershausen, to form a new and larger municipality Kemmental.
