= Lengwil railway station =

Train station in Switzerland

Lengwil
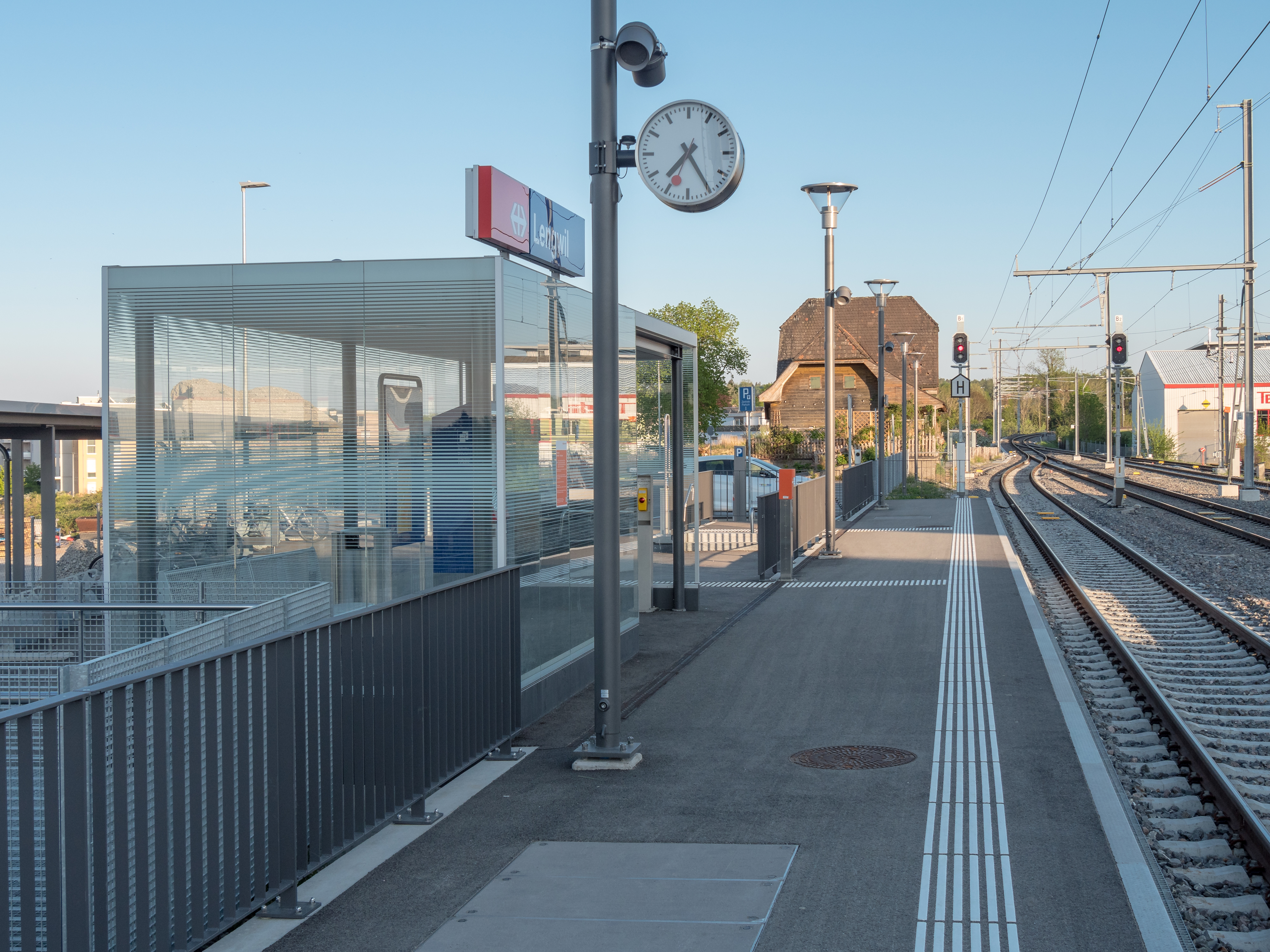
- The current shelter and disused building in 2020

General information
- Location: Lengwil; Switzerland
- Coordinates: 47°37′34″N 9°11′24″E
- Elevation: 509 m (1,670 ft)
- Owner: Thurbo
- Line: Wil–Kreuzlingen line
- Distance: 33.5 km (20.8 mi) from Wil
- Train operators: Thurbo
- Connections
- Bus: PostAuto bus route 924

Other information
- Fare zone: 255 (Tarifverbund Ostwind)

Passengers
- 2018: 260 per weekday

Services
Preceding station	St. Gallen S-Bahn	Following station
Siegershausen towards Weinfelden	S14	Kreuzlingen Bernrain towards Konstanz
Siegershausen towards Weinfelden	SN14 Limited service	Kreuzlingen Bernrain towards Konstanz
Location
- Location within Switzerland Location within Canton of Thurgau

Lengwil railway station (German: Bahnhof Lengwil) is a railway station in the municipality of Lengwil, in the Swiss canton of Thurgau. It is an intermediate stop on the standard gauge Wil–Kreuzlingen line of Thurbo, and is served as a request stop by local trains only.

== Services ==
The following services stop at Lengwil:

- St. Gallen S-Bahn S14: half-hourly service between Weinfelden and Konstanz, via Kreuzlingen.

During weekends, the station is served by a nighttime S-Bahn service (SN14), offered by Ostwind tariff network, and operated by Thurbo for St. Gallen S-Bahn.

- St. Gallen S-Bahn SN14: hourly service to Weinfelden and to Konstanz, via Kreuzlingen.

== See also ==
- Bodensee S-Bahn
- Rail transport in Switzerland
