= Neuwilen =

Village in Thurgau, Switzerland

Coordinates: 47.622°N 9.134°E

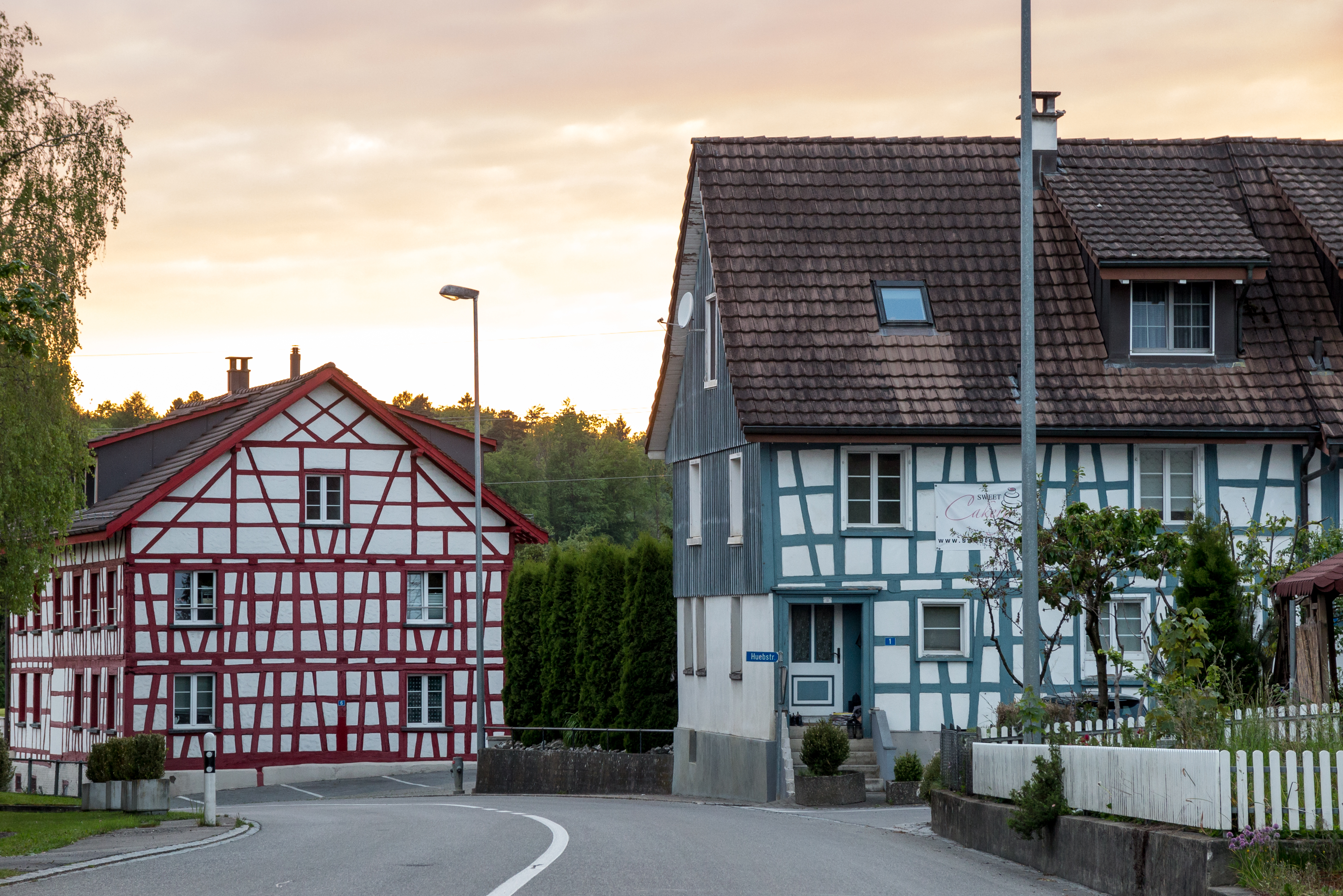
Timber-framed houses at the main street

Neuwilen is a village and former municipality in the canton of Thurgau, Switzerland.

The municipality also contained the village Schwaderloh.

In 1996 the municipality was merged with the other, neighboring municipalities Alterswilen, Altishausen, Dotnacht, Ellighausen, Hugelshofen, Lippoldswilen and Siegershausen to form a new and larger municipality Kemmental.

As of 2024, about 576 people lived in Neuwilen. The only public buildings are the primary school building and the kindergarten building.
