= Kehlhof railway station =

Train station in Switzerland

Kehlhof
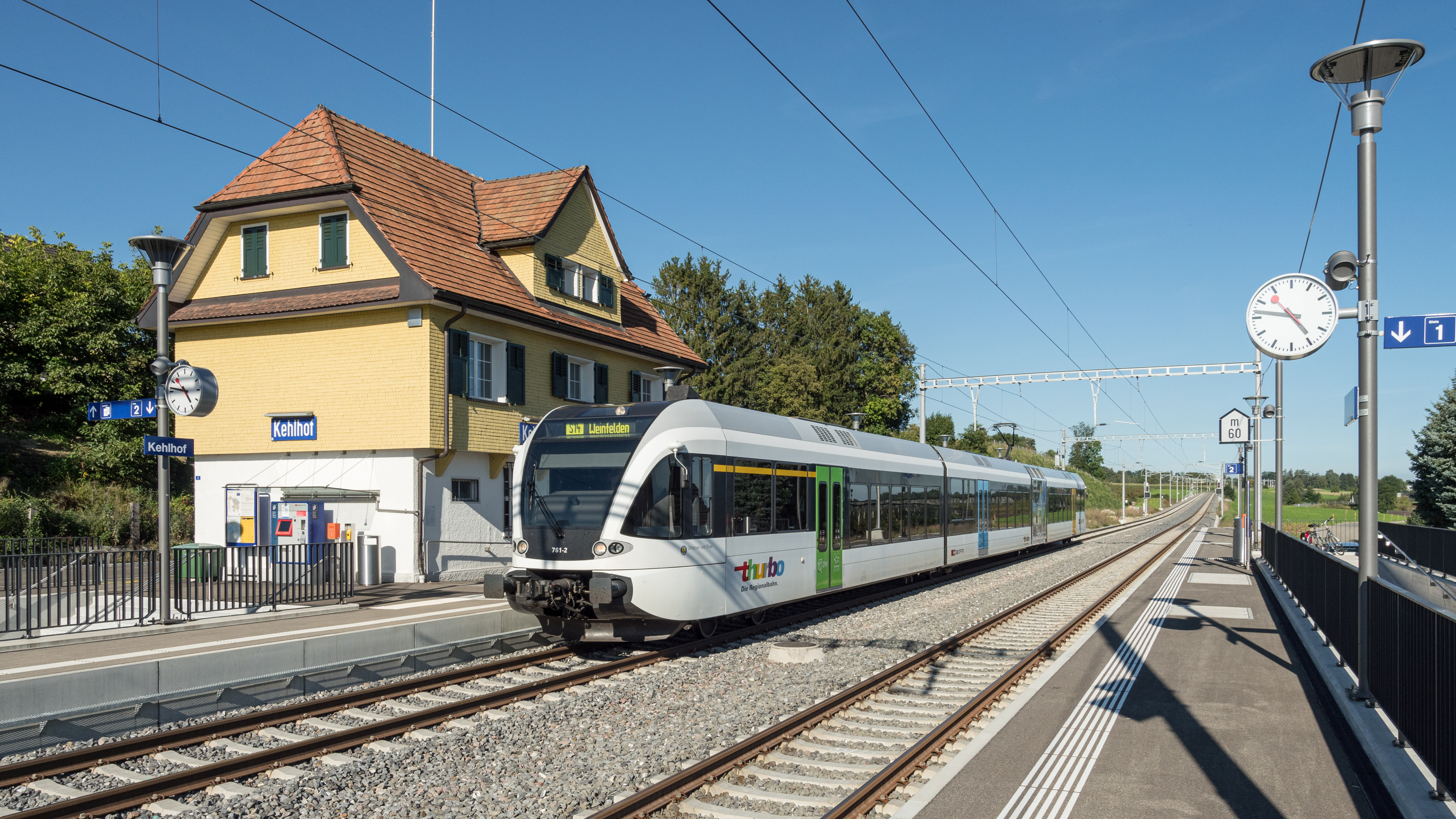
- Station in 2019

General information
- Location: Berg; Switzerland
- Coordinates: 47°34′19″N 9°10′12″E
- Elevation: 508 m (1,667 ft)
- Owner: Thurbo
- Line: Wil–Kreuzlingen
- Distance: 24.3 km (15.1 mi) from Wil
- Train operators: Thurbo

Other information
- Fare zone: 925 (Tarifverbund Ostwind)

Passengers
- 2018: 140 per weekday

Services
Preceding station	St. Gallen S-Bahn	Following station
Weinfelden Terminus	S14	Berg towards Konstanz
Weinfelden Terminus	SN14 Limited service	Berg towards Konstanz
Location
- Location within Switzerland Location within Canton of Thurgau

Kehlhof railway station (German: Bahnhof Kehlhof) is a railway station in the hamlet of Kehlhof in the municipality of Berg, in the Swiss canton of Thurgau. It is an intermediate stop on the standard gauge Wil–Kreuzlingen line of Thurbo, and is served as a request stop by local trains only.

== Services ==
The following services stop at Kehlhof:

- St. Gallen S-Bahn S14: half-hourly service from Weinfelden to Konstanz, via Kreuzlingen.

During weekends, the station is served by a nighttime S-Bahn service (SN14), offered by Ostwind tariff network, and operated by Thurbo for St. Gallen S-Bahn.

- St. Gallen S-Bahn SN14: hourly service to Weinfelden and to Konstanz, via Kreuzlingen.

== See also ==
- Bodensee S-Bahn
- Rail transport in Switzerland
