= S14 (St. Gallen S-Bahn) =

Railway in St. Gallen, Switzerland

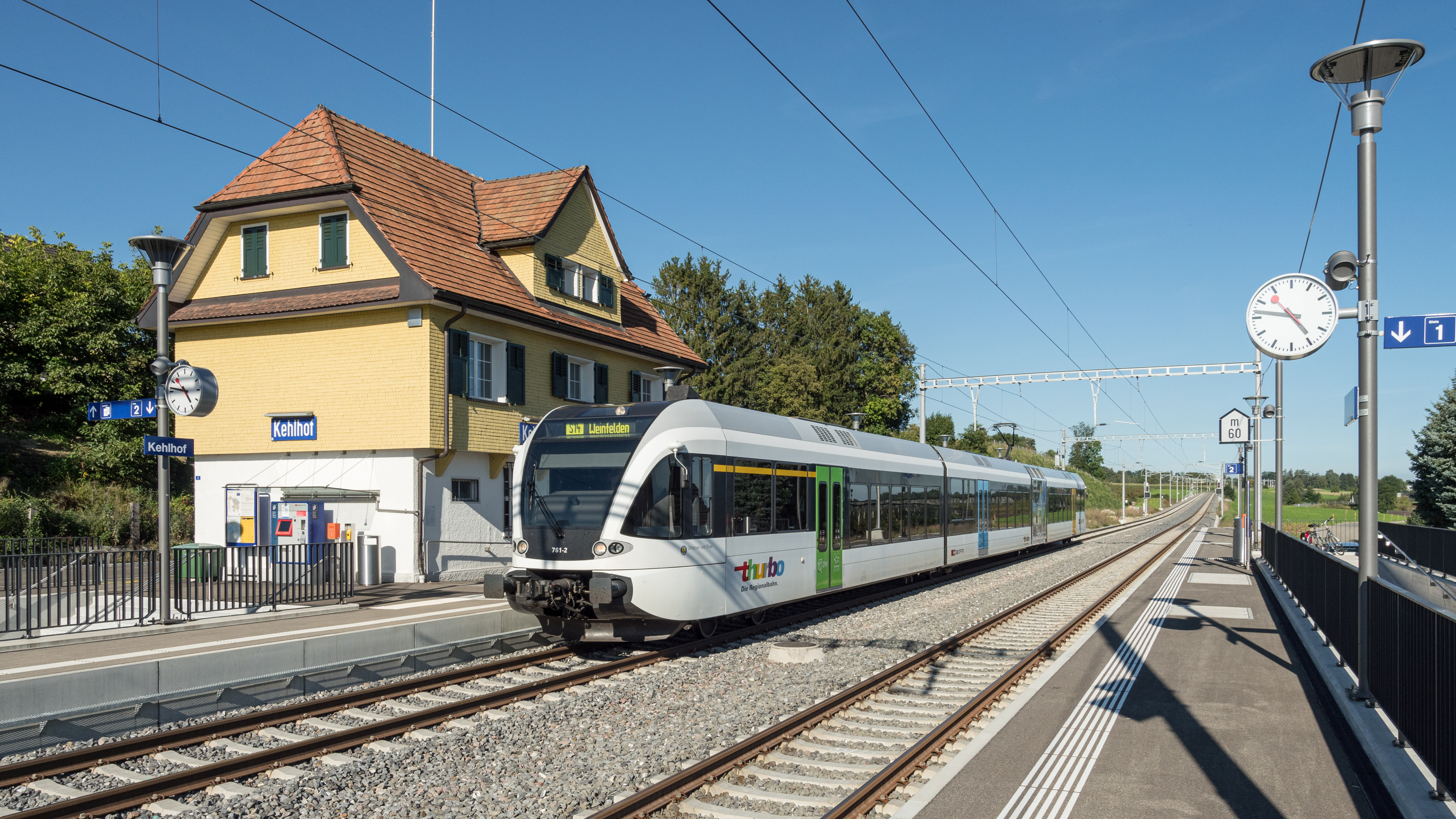
- A Weinfelden-bound S14 at Kehlhof in 2019

Overview
- First service: 15 December 2013
- Current operator(s): THURBO

Route
- Termini: Konstanz; Weinfelden
- Stops: 7
- Distance travelled: 22.8 kilometres (14.2 mi)
- Average journey time: 25 minutes
- Service frequency: Every 30 minutes
- Line(s) used: Wil–Kreuzlingen line; High Rhine line

The S14 is a railway service of the St. Gallen S-Bahn that provides half-hourly service between Weinfelden, in the Swiss canton of Thurgau, and Konstanz in southern Germany. The line is also part of the Bodensee S-Bahn. THURBO, a joint venture of Swiss Federal Railways and the canton of Thurgau, operates the service.

== Operations ==
The S14 operates every 30 minutes between Weinfelden and Konstanz, except on Sundays when it operates hourly. In Konstanz, an hourly connection is made with a RegioExpress service to and from St. Gallen and Herisau. The hourly Lucerne–Konstanz InterRegio 75 supplements the S14. An additional S14 operates an hourly shuttle service between Konstanz and Kreuzlingen; this, with the regular S14 service and the IR 75, creates a 15-minute frequency between the two cities.

== Route ==
S14 Weinfelden – Konstanz

- Weinfelden
- Kehlhof (stops only on request)
- Berg (stops only on request)
- Siegershausen (stops only on request)
- Lengwil (stops only on request)
- Kreuzlingen Bernrain (stops only on request)
- Tägerwilen Dorf (stops only on request)
- Kreuzlingen
- Konstanz

== History ==
The December 2013 timetable change applied the S14 designation to an existing half-hourly service between Weinfelden and Konstanz.
