= Andhausen =

Village in Thurgau, Switzerland

- Former municipality
- Andhausen (foreground) and Berg
- Location of Andhausen
- Location within Switzerland Location within Canton of Thurgau
- Coordinates: 47.5794°N 9.1808°E
- Country: Switzerland
- Canton: Thurgau
- District: {{{district}}}
- Municipality: Berg

Population (1992)
  - Total: 152
- Time zone: UTC+01:00 (CET)
  - Summer (DST): UTC+02:00 (CEST)
- ISO 3166 code: CH-TG
- Website

Andhausen is a former Ortsgemeinde (local commune) in the canton of Thurgau, Switzerland. It belonged to the former Munizipalgemeinde (municipal commune) of Berg and was dissolved in 1993, when it was united with the former Ortsgemeinde of Berg. Since 1995 it has been part of the political municipality of Berg.

== History ==
Andhausen is first mentioned in 1159 as Anninhusin. Early medieval graves have been found there. From the late Middle Ages the clustered village (Haufendorf) shared the fate of the village of Berg, 1 km to the west, to whose court lordship (Gerichtsherrschaft) and parish it belonged.

Arable farming and fruit growing, as well as a tannery (1873 – c. 1980), shaped the appearance of the village until the 1970s. A company in the semiconductor industry has been based there since 1980. More recently an extensive area of single-family houses has grown up between the former village center and Berg.

Andhausen had 80 inhabitants in 1850, 111 in 1910, 78 in 1920, 66 in 1960 and 152 in 1992.

== Bibliography ==
- Hinweisinventar alter Bauten und Ortsbilder im Kanton Thurgau, manuscript, 1986 (State Archives of Thurgau)
- Regine Abegg and Peter Erni, Zwischen Bodensee und Bürglen, 2018, pp. 82–85 (Die Kunstdenkmäler des Kantons Thurgau, 9)
