= Altishausen =

Village in Thurgau, Switzerland

Coordinates: 47°36′4.48″N 9°10′14.32″E

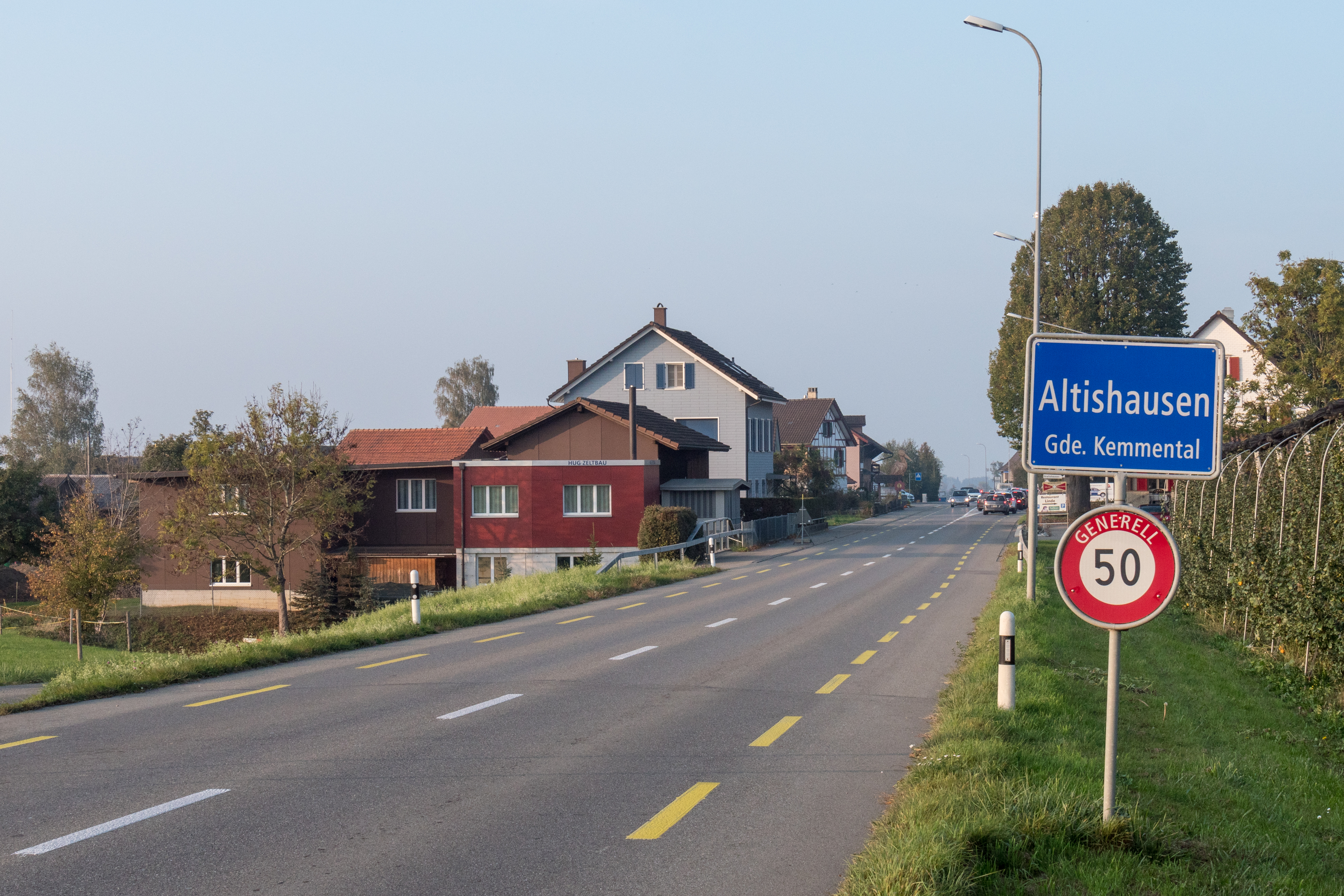

Altishausen is a village and former municipality in the canton of Thurgau, Switzerland.

It was first recorded in year 1159 as Altinshusin.

The municipality had 120 inhabitants in 1850, which increased to 155 in 1950. After a decline to 111 in 1970 it rose to 161 in 1990. Altishausen currently has 323 residents (2025).

In 1996 the municipality was merged with the other, neighboring municipalities Alterswilen, Dotnacht, Ellighausen, Hugelshofen, Lippoldswilen, Neuwilen and Siegershausen to form a new and larger municipality Kemmental.
