= Dotnacht =

Coordinates: 47°36′3″N 9°8′28″E

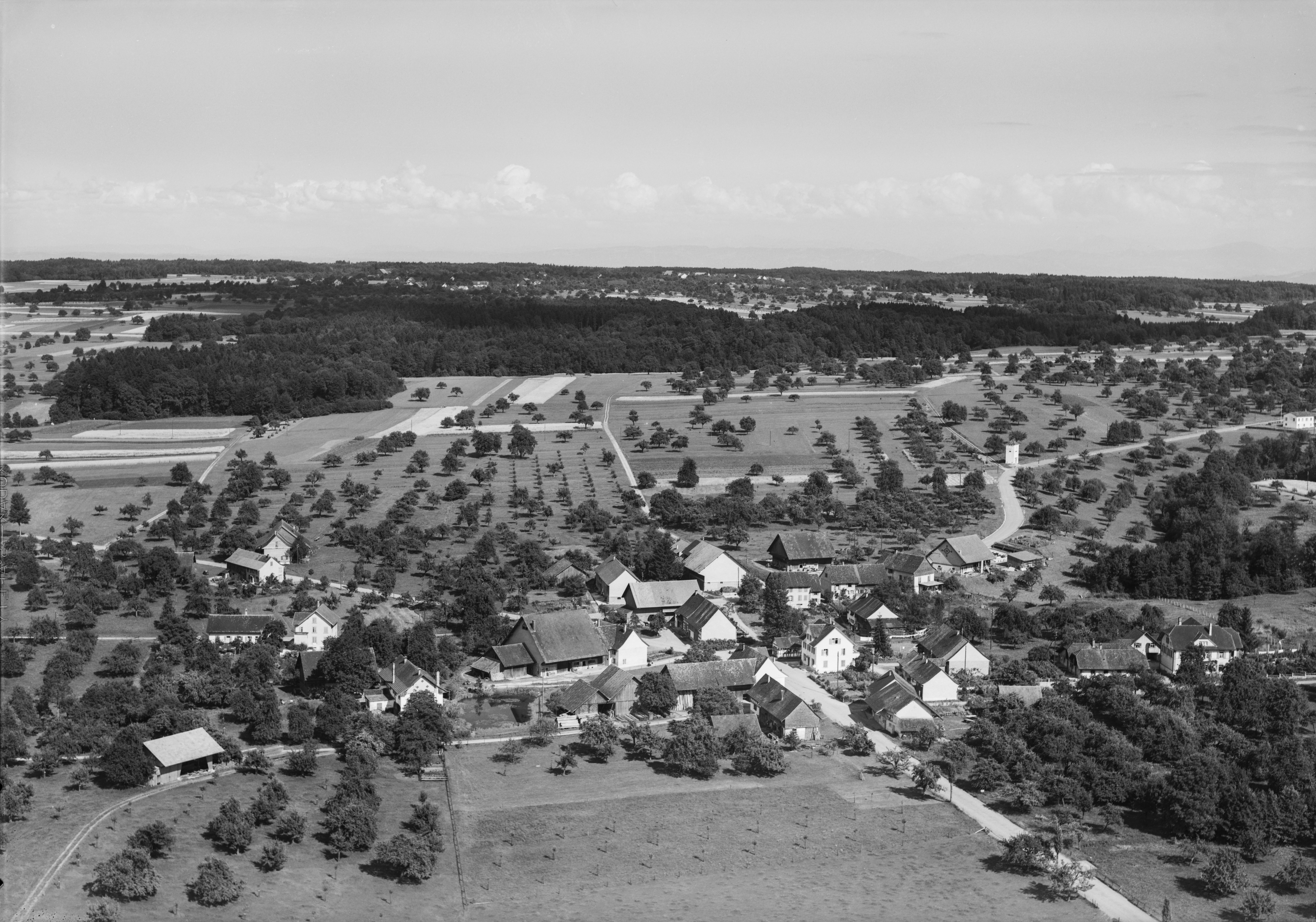
Aerial view (1954)

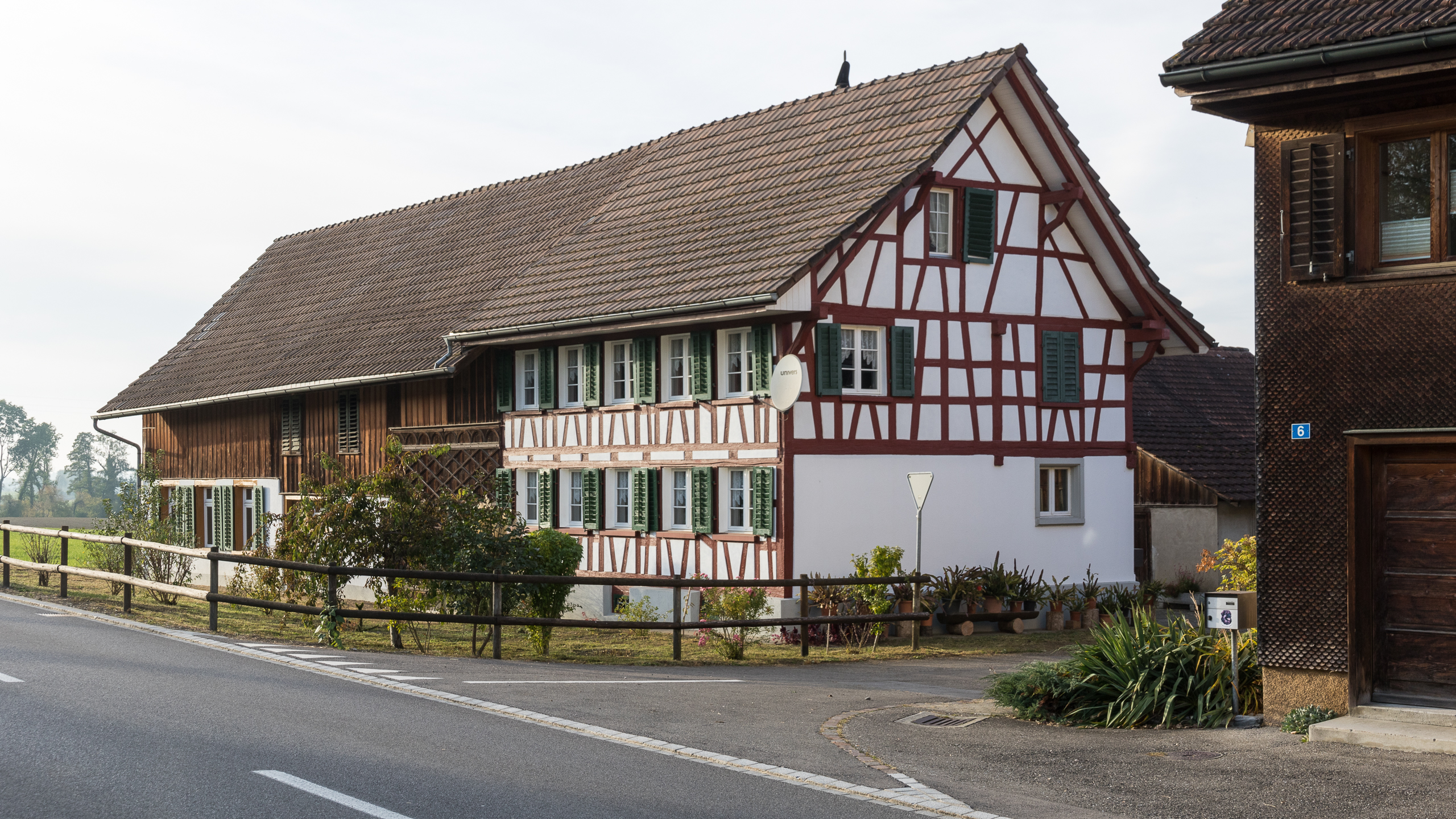
19th century farmhouse in Dotnacht

Dotnacht is a village and former municipality in the canton of Thurgau, Switzerland.

It was first recorded in the year 824 as Tottinheiche.

The municipality contained the villages Engelswilen, Aufhäusern, Altshof, among others. In 1850, it had 327 inhabitants, which decreased to 281 in 1900. After a temporary increase to 303 in 1950, the population declined again to 244 in 1990. Dotnacht currently has 308 residents (2025).

In 1996, the municipality was merged with the neighboring municipalities Alterswilen, Altishausen, Ellighausen, Hugelshofen, Lippoldswilen, Neuwilen, and Siegershausen, forming a new and larger municipality of Kemmental.
