= Altshof =

Village in the canton of Thurgau, Switzerland

Coordinates: 47°35′30.52″N 9°8′45.02″E

Altshof is a village in the canton of Thurgau, Switzerland.

It was first recorded in year 775 as Adalolteshoba.

Altshof is located in the former municipality Dotnacht. In 1996 Dotnacht municipality merged with its neighbor to form a new and larger municipality Kemmental.
