= Berg railway station (Switzerland) =

Train station in Switzerland

Berg
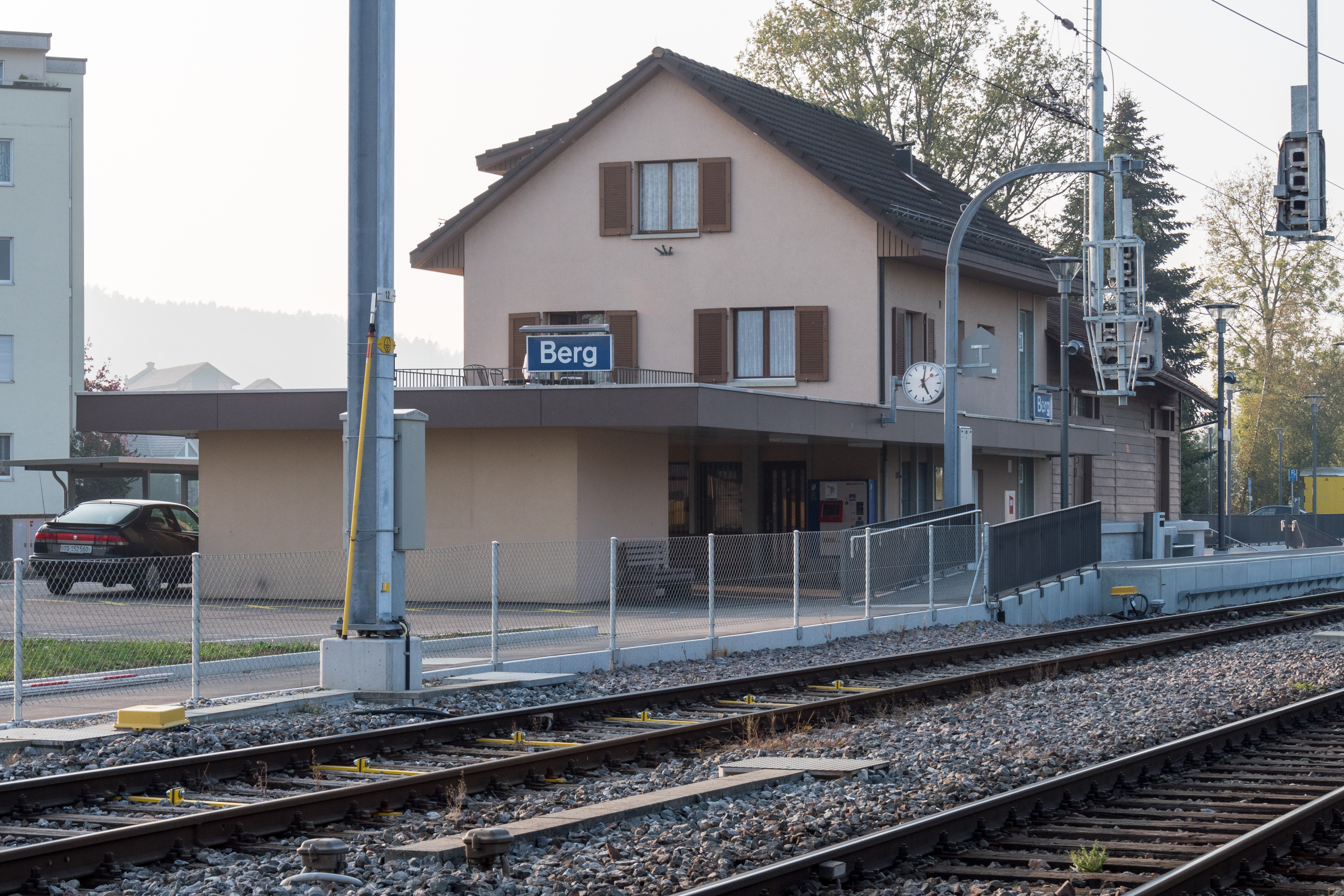
- The station building in 2018

General information
- Location: Berg; Switzerland
- Coordinates: 47°34′55″N 9°10′30″E
- Elevation: 554 m (1,818 ft)
- Owner: Thurbo
- Line: Wil–Kreuzlingen
- Distance: 27.2 km (16.9 mi) from Wil
- Train operators: Thurbo

Other information
- Fare zone: 925 (Tarifverbund Ostwind)

Passengers
- 2018: 380 per weekday

Services
Preceding station	St. Gallen S-Bahn	Following station
Kehlhof towards Weinfelden	S14	Siegershausen towards Konstanz
Kehlhof towards Weinfelden	SN14 Limited service	Siegershausen towards Konstanz
Location
- Location within Switzerland Location within Canton of Thurgau

Berg railway station (German: Bahnhof Berg) is a railway station in the municipality of Berg, in the Swiss canton of Thurgau. It is an intermediate stop on the standard gauge Wil–Kreuzlingen line of Thurbo, and is served as a request stop by local trains only.

== Services ==
The following services stop at Berg:

- St. Gallen S-Bahn S14: half-hourly service between Weinfelden and Konstanz, via Kreuzlingen.

During weekends, the station is served by a nighttime S-Bahn service (SN14), offered by Ostwind tariff network, and operated by Thurbo for St. Gallen S-Bahn.

- St. Gallen S-Bahn SN14: hourly service to Weinfelden and to Konstanz, via Kreuzlingen.

== See also ==
- Bodensee S-Bahn
- Rail transport in Switzerland
