= Ellighausen =

Village and former municipality in the canton of Thurgau, Switzerland

Coordinates: 47°36′50″N 9°8′8″E

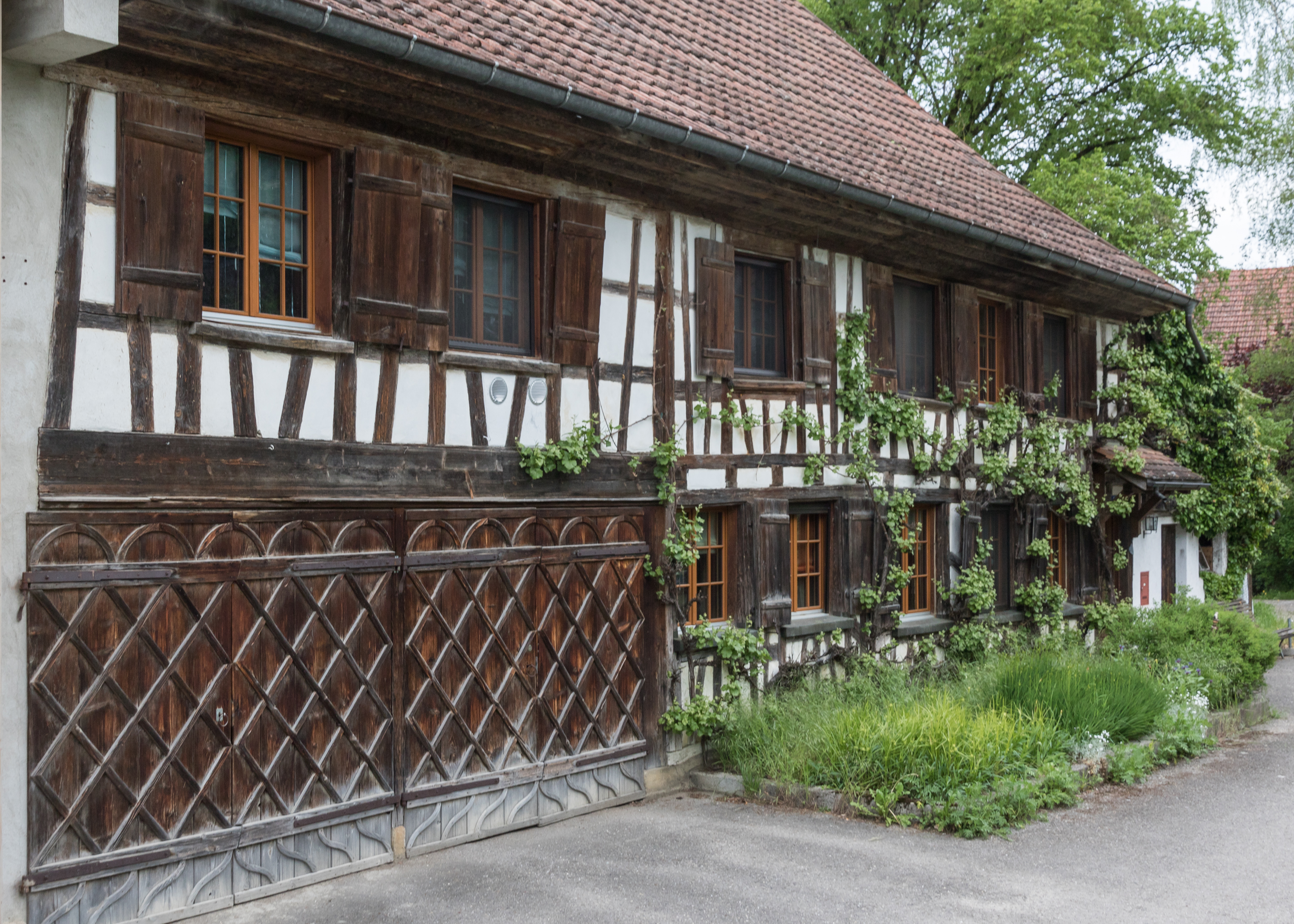
19th-century half-timbered house

Ellighausen is a village and former municipality in the canton of Thurgau, Switzerland.

It was first recorded in year 1331 as Adlikusen.

The municipality also contained the village Bächi, Geboltschhusen and Neumühle. It had 179 inhabitants in 1850, which decreased to 150 in 1900, 136 in 1950 and 96 in 1990. Currently there are 166 inhabitants registered in 2025.

In 1996 the municipality was merged with the other, neighboring municipalities Alterswilen, Altishausen, Dotnacht, Hugelshofen, Lippoldswilen, Neuwilen and Siegershausen to form a new and larger municipality Kemmental.
