= Bächi =

Coordinates: 47°36′36″N 9°7′46″E

Bächi is a village in the canton of Thurgau, Switzerland.

It was first recorded in year 1259 as Baecho.

Bächi is located in the former municipality Ellighausen. In 1996, Ellighausen municipality merged with its neighbors to form a new and larger municipality, Kemmental.
