= Alterswilen =

Village in Thurgau, Switzerland

Coordinates: 47°37′N 9°09′E

Alterswilen is a village and former municipality in the canton of Thurgau, Switzerland.

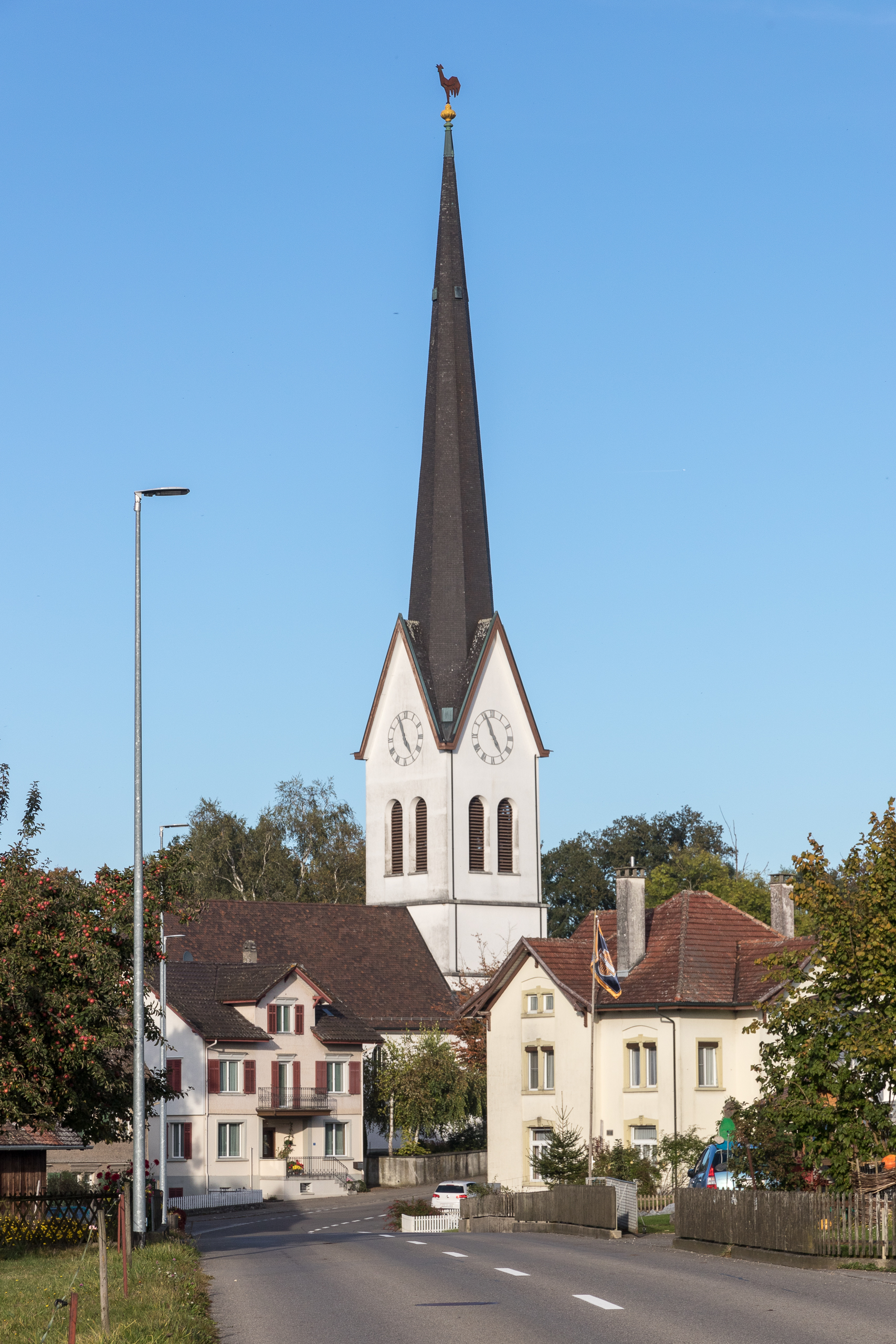
Reformed church Alterswilen

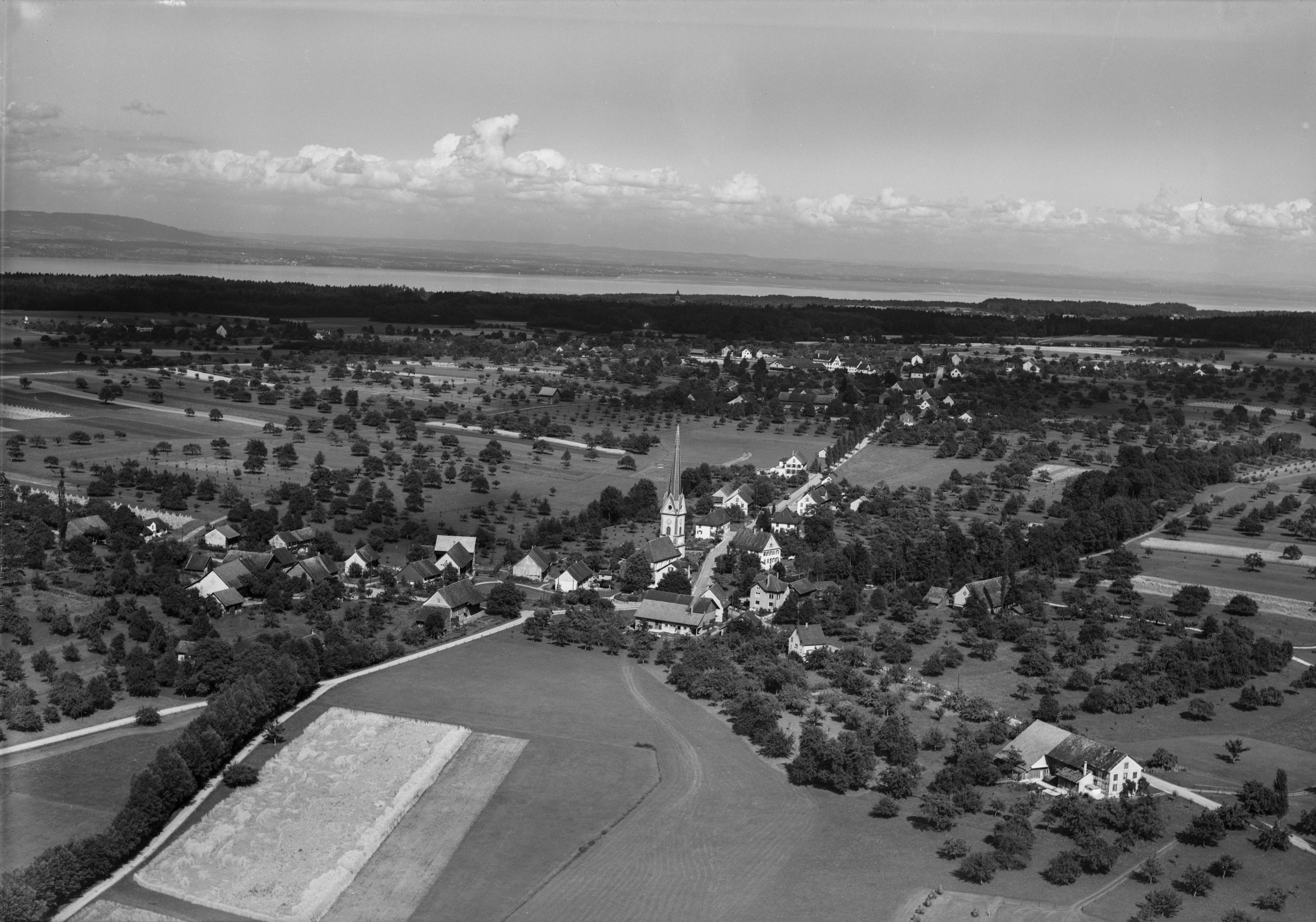
Aerial view (1954)

It was first recorded in year 1248 as Alterswilaer.

The municipality also contained the village Bommen. It had 129 inhabitants in 1850, which increased to 186 in 1920. After a decline to 134 in 1970 it was back on 182 in 1990. As at 31 December 2025, Alterswilen had a population of 254.

In 1996 the municipality was merged with the other, neighboring municipalities Altishausen, Dotnacht, Ellighausen, Hugelshofen, Lippoldswilen, Neuwilen and Siegershausen to form a new and larger municipality Kemmental.
