= Siegershausen =

Former municipality in Thurgau, Switzerland

Coordinates: 47°37′N 9°09′E

Siegershausen is a village and former municipality in the canton of Thurgau, Switzerland.

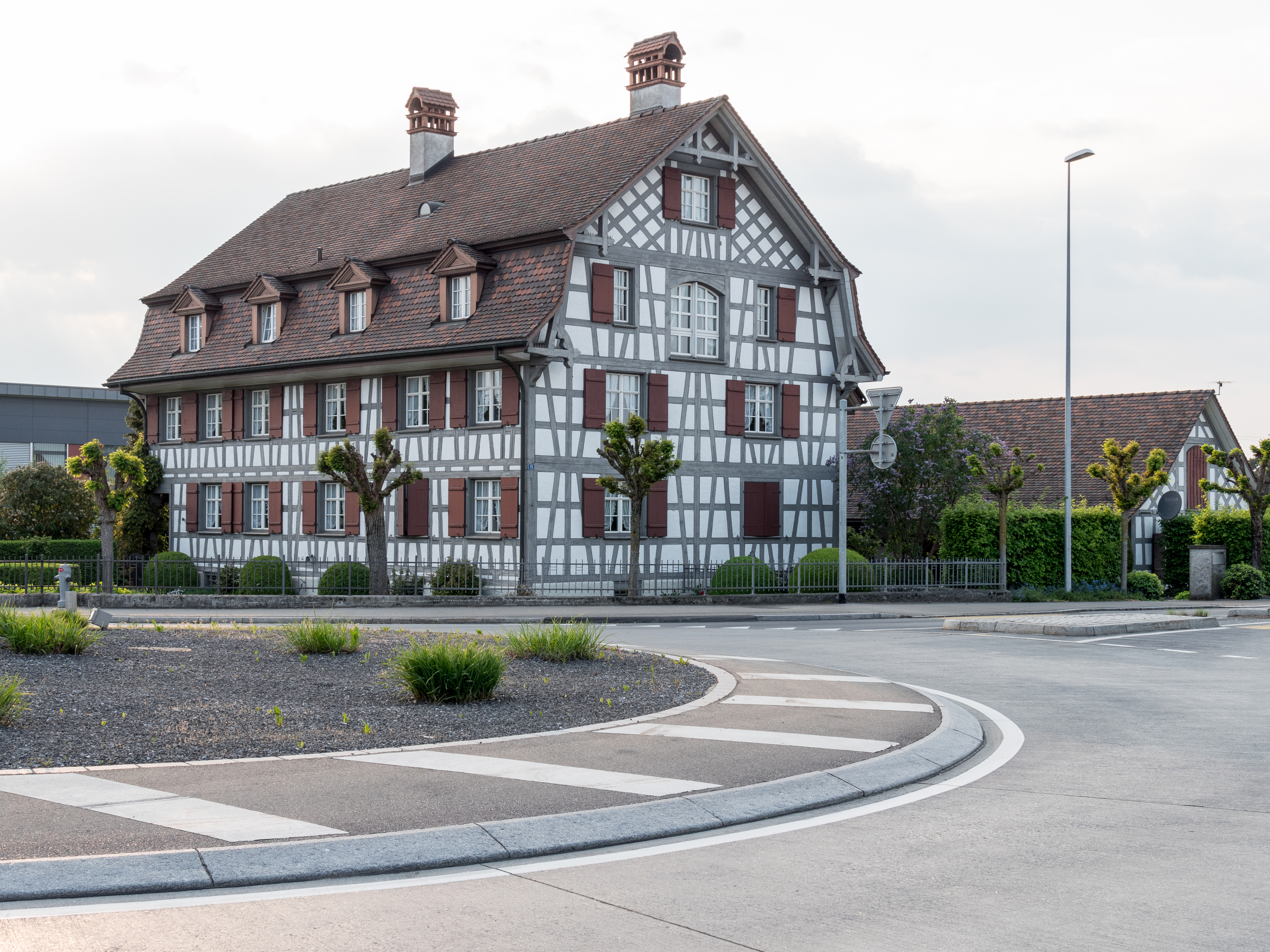
Alter Stern in Siegershausen

In 1984 the municipality Dippishausen-Oftershausen was incorporated into Siegershausen.

In 1996 Siegershausen municipality was merged with the other, neighboring municipalities Alterswilen, Altishausen, Dotnacht, Ellighausen, Hugelshofen, Lippoldswilen and Neuwilen to form a new and larger municipality Kemmental.
