= Kemmental =

- Municipality
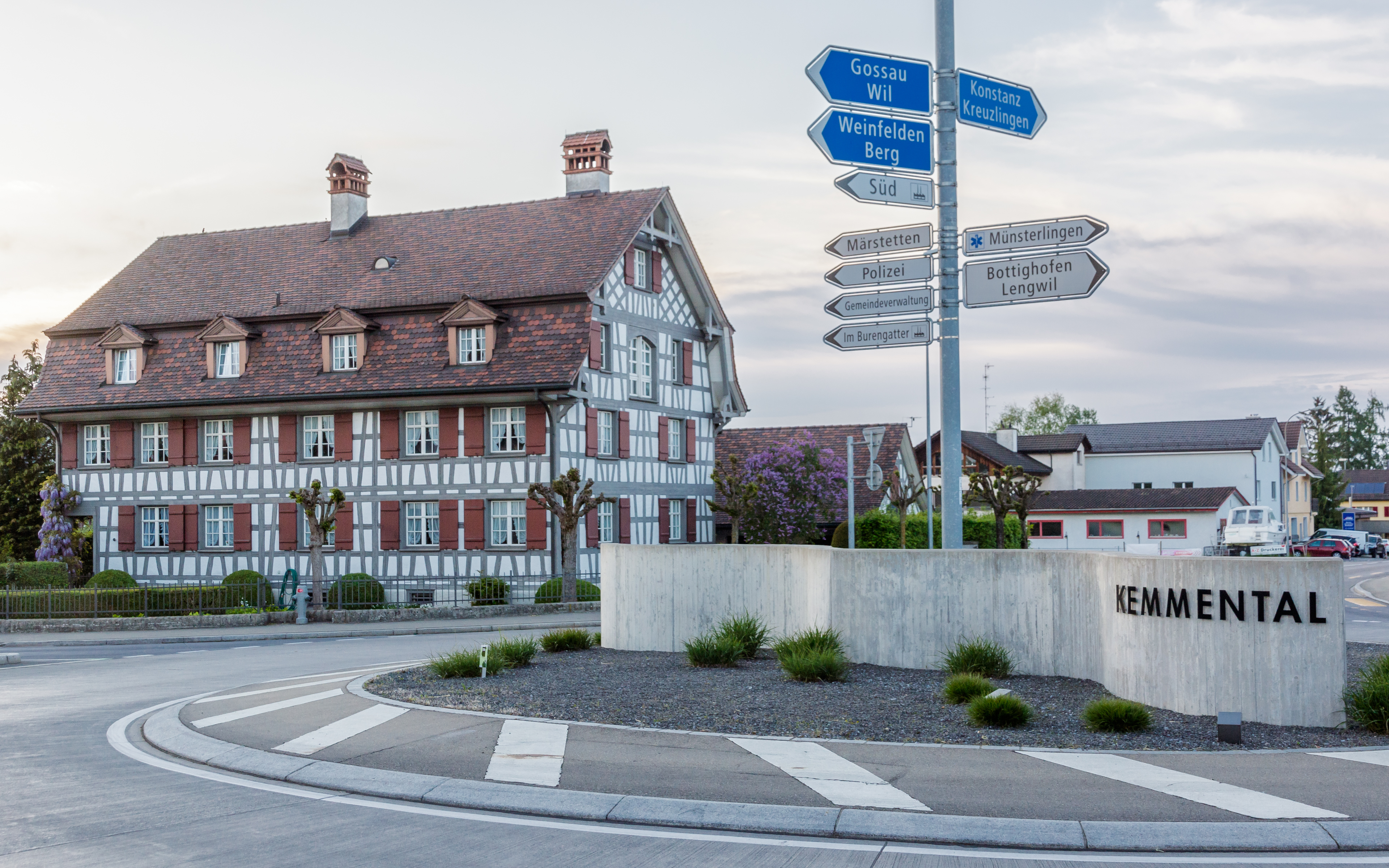
- Kemmental-Siegershausen

- Coat of arms
- Location of Kemmental
- Location within Switzerland Location within Canton of Thurgau
- Coordinates: 47°37′N 9°10′E
- Country: Switzerland
- Canton: Thurgau
- District: Kreuzlingen

Area
  - Total: 25.02 km^{2} (9.66 sq mi)
- Elevation: 548 m (1,798 ft)

Population (December 2025)
  - Total: 2,904
  - Density: 116.1/km^{2} (300.6/sq mi)
- Time zone: UTC+01:00 (CET)
  - Summer (DST): UTC+02:00 (CEST)
- Postal code: 8565, 8566, 8573
- SFOS number: 4666
- ISO 3166 code: CH-TG
- Localities: Alterswilen, Altishausen, Bommen, Dotnacht, Ellighausen, Engelswilen, Hugelshofen, Lipperwilen, Lippoldswilen, Neuwilen, Schwaderloh, Siegershausen
- Surrounded by: Berg, Kreuzlingen, Lengwil, Märstetten, Tägerwilen, Wäldi, Weinfelden, Wigoltingen
- Website: www.kemmental.ch

Kemmental is a municipality in the district of Kreuzlingen in the canton of Thurgau in Switzerland.

The municipality was formed on 1 January 1996 through the merger of Alterswilen, Hugelshofen, Altishausen, Dotnacht, Ellighausen, Lippoldswilen, Neuwilen and Siegershausen.

== History ==
Each of the former municipalities that now make up Kemmental had a long history as an independent municipality. Alterswilen is first mentioned in 1248 as Alterswilaer while the hamlet of Bommen was first mentioned in 1348 as Boumen. Altishausen is first mentioned in 1159 as Altinshusin. Ellighausen is first mentioned in 1331 as Adlikusen. Of the other villages that made up Ellighausen, Bächi was mentioned in 1259 as Baecho, Geboltschhusen in 1385 as Geboltzhusen. Ellighausen also included the hamlet of Neumühle. Lippoldswilen is first mentioned in 1303 as Lupoltwile. Neuwilen is first mentioned in 1159 as Nunewillare. Siegershausen is first mentioned in 1227 as Sigehardishusin. Hugelshofen is first mentioned in 1176 as Hugolteshouen. Dotnacht is first mentioned in 824 as Tottinheiche, and Altshof, a village in the former municipality of Dotnacht is first mentioned in 775 as Adalolteshoba.

== Geography ==
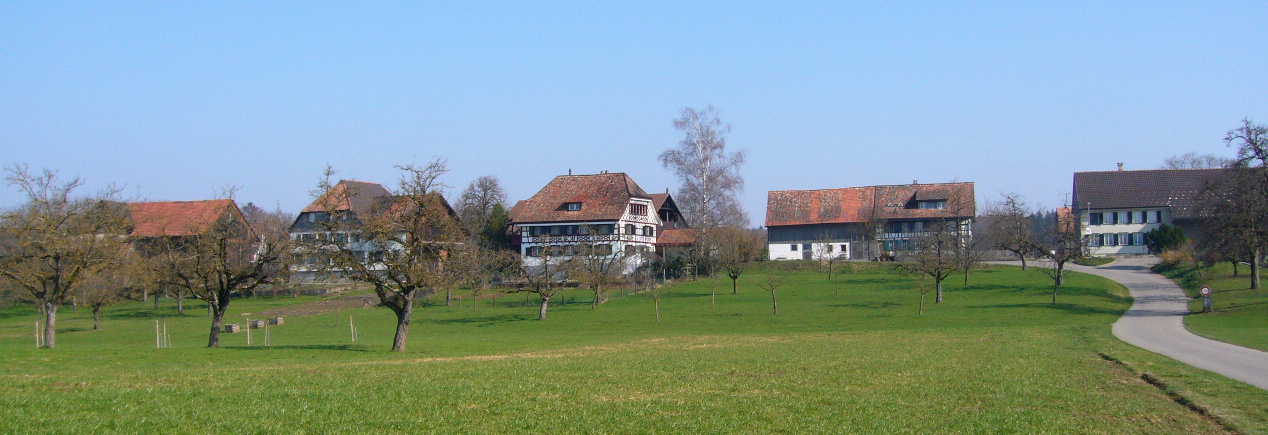
The hamlet of Bommen

Kemmental has an area, as of 2009, of 25.02 square kilometers (9.66 sq mi). Of this area, 17.01 km^{2} (6.57 sq mi) or 68.0% is used for agricultural purposes, while 5.78 km^{2} (2.23 sq mi) or 23.1% is forested. Of the rest of the land, 1.99 km^{2} (0.77 sq mi) or 8.0% is settled (buildings or roads), 0.11 km^{2} (27 acres) or 0.4% is either rivers or lakes and 0.16 km^{2} (0.062 sq mi) or 0.6% is unproductive land.

Of the built up area, industrial buildings made up 3.2% of the total area while housing and buildings made up 0.4% and transportation infrastructure made up 0.6%. while parks, green belts and sports fields made up 3.6%. Out of the forested land, 21.3% of the total land area is heavily forested and 1.8% is covered with orchards or small clusters of trees. Of the agricultural land, 61.6% is used for growing crops, while 6.4% is used for orchards or vine crops. All the water in the municipality is in lakes. The lake Bommer Weiher is located in the municipality.

The municipality is located in the Kreuzlingen district. It was created in 1996 when the municipalities of Alterswilen, Altishausen, Dotnacht, Ellighausen, Hugelshofen, Lippoldswilen, Neuwilen and Siegershausen formed the new municipality of Kemmental. It is one of the largest municipalities in the Kreuzlingen district.

== Demographics ==
Kemmental has a population (as of December 2020) of 2,603. As of 2008, 11.5% of the population are foreign nationals. Over the last 10 years (1997–2007) the population has changed at a rate of 11.5%. Most of the population (as of 2000) speaks German (97.0%), with Serbo-Croatian being second most common ( 0.6%) and Italian being third ( 0.4%).

As of 2008, the gender distribution of the population was 50.5% male and 49.5% female. The population was made up of 989 Swiss men (44.7% of the population), and 127 (5.7%) non-Swiss men. There were 968 Swiss women (43.8%), and 127 (5.7%) non-Swiss women.

In 2008 there were 14 live births to Swiss citizens and births to non-Swiss citizens, and in same time span there were 16 deaths of Swiss citizens and 1 non-Swiss citizen death. Ignoring immigration and emigration, the population of Swiss citizens decreased by 2 while the foreign population decreased by 1. There were 2 Swiss men who emigrated from Switzerland to another country, 1 Swiss woman who emigrated from Switzerland to another country, 10 non-Swiss men who emigrated from Switzerland to another country and 9 non-Swiss women who emigrated from Switzerland to another country. The total Swiss population change in 2008 (from all sources) was a decrease of 12 and the non-Swiss population change was an increase of 20 people. This represents a population growth rate of 0.4%.

The age distribution, as of 2009, in Kemmental is; 210 children or 9.4% of the population are between 0 and 9 years old and 349 teenagers or 15.7% are between 10 and 19. Of the adult population, 224 people or 10.0% of the population are between 20 and 29 years old. 268 people or 12.0% are between 30 and 39, 430 people or 19.3% are between 40 and 49, and 313 people or 14.0% are between 50 and 59. The senior population distribution is 216 people or 9.7% of the population are between 60 and 69 years old, 135 people or 6.1% are between 70 and 79, there are 76 people or 3.4% who are between 80 and 89, and there are 8 people or 0.4% who are 90 and older.

As of 2000, there were 708 private households in the municipality, and an average of 2.9 persons per household. In 2000 there were 308 single family homes (or 85.1% of the total) out of a total of 362 inhabited buildings. There were 40 two family buildings (11.0%), 4 three family buildings (1.1%) and 10 multi-family buildings (or 2.8%). There were 423 (or 19.3%) persons who were part of a couple without children, and 1,273 (or 58.2%) who were part of a couple with children. There were 164 (or 7.5%) people who lived in single parent home, while there are 22 persons who were adult children living with one or both parents, 24 persons who lived in a household made up of relatives, 20 who lived in a household made up of unrelated persons, and 133 who are either institutionalized or live in another type of collective housing.

The vacancy rate for the municipality, in 2008, was 0.12%. As of 2007, the construction rate of new housing units was 3.2 new units per 1000 residents. In 2000 there were 763 apartments in the municipality. The most common apartment size was the 6 room apartment of which there were 218. There were 11 single room apartments and 218 apartments with six or more rooms.

In the 2007 federal election the most popular party was the SVP which received 59.55% of the vote. The next three most popular parties were the FDP (9.87%), the Green Party (7.86%) and the CVP (7.66%). In the federal election, a total of 779 votes were cast, and the voter turnout was 51.2%.

The historical population is given in the following table:

Year	Population Alterswilen	Population Altishausen	Population Ellighausen	Population Lippoldswilen	Population Neuwilen	Population Siegershausen	Population Hugelshofen	Population Dotnacht
1850	1,281	120	179	153	429	131	769	327
1888	1,283	-	-	-	-	-	-	-
1900	-	-	150	154	409	108	641	281
1930	1,184	-	-	-	-	-	-	-
1950	-	155	136	138	351	144	662	303
1970	-	111	-	-	-	-	-	-
1990	1,295	161	96	97	356	403	569	244
Year	Population, Kemmental							
2000	2,189							

== Sights ==
The entire hamlet of Bommen is designated as part of the Inventory of Swiss Heritage Sites.

== Economy ==
As of 2007, Kemmental had an unemployment rate of 1.82%. As of 2005, there were 278 people employed in the primary economic sector and about 108 businesses involved in this sector. 191 people are employed in the secondary sector and there are 34 businesses in this sector. 266 people are employed in the tertiary sector, with 64 businesses in this sector.

In 2000 there were 1,533 workers who lived in the municipality. Of these, 679 or about 44.3% of the residents worked outside Kemmental while 185 people commuted into the municipality for work. There were a total of 1,039 jobs (of at least 6 hours per week) in the municipality. Of the working population, 3.4% used public transportation to get to work, and 51.9% used a private car.

== Religion ==
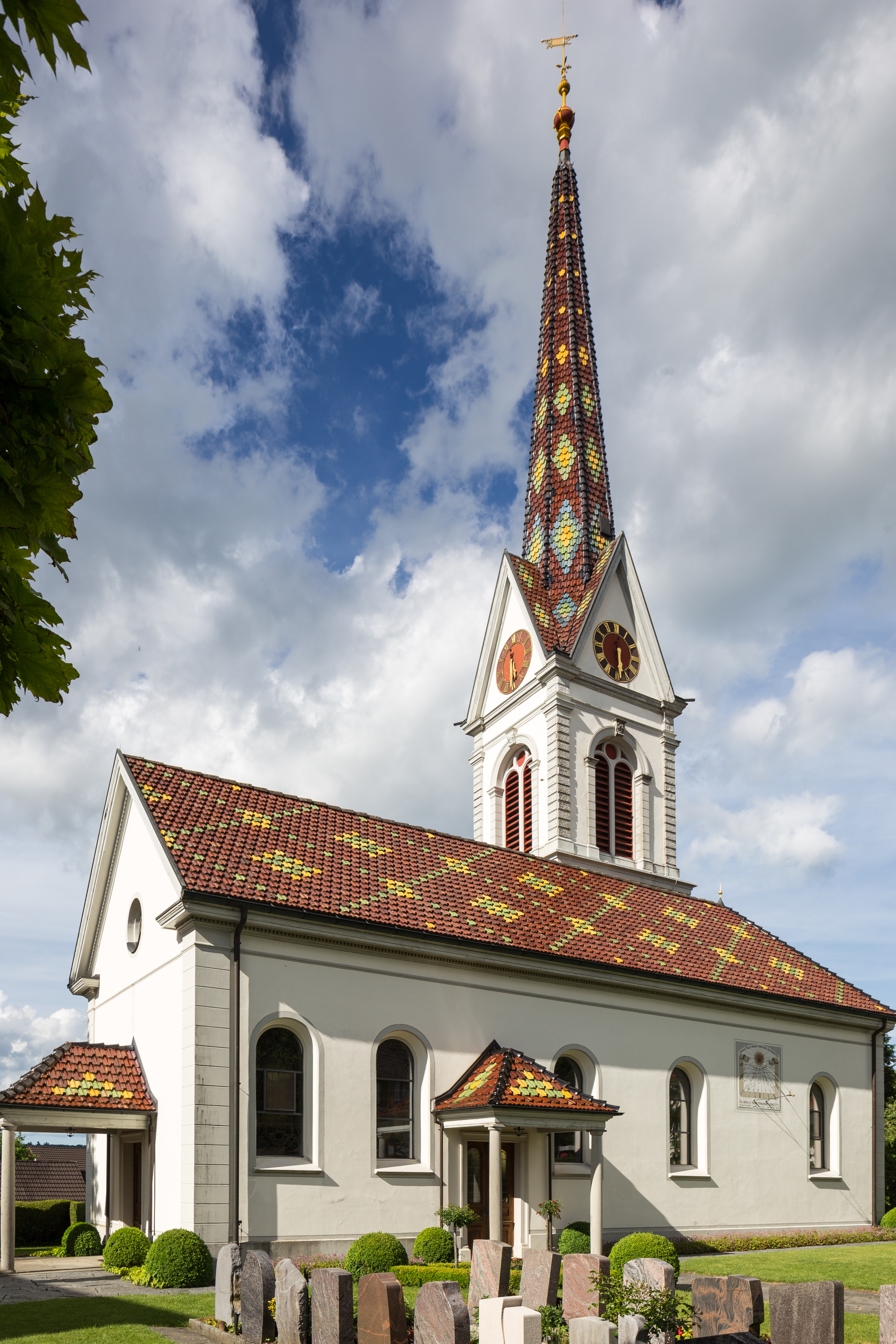
Reformed Church in Hugelshofen

From the 2000 census, 523 or 23.9% were Roman Catholic, while 1,359 or 62.1% belonged to the Swiss Reformed Church. Of the rest of the population, there was 1 Old Catholic who belonged to the Christian Catholic Church of Switzerland there are 23 individuals (or about 1.05% of the population) who belong to the Orthodox Church, and there are 68 individuals (or about 3.11% of the population) who belong to another Christian church. There were 11 (or about 0.50% of the population) who are Islamic. There are 2 individuals (or about 0.09% of the population) who belong to another church (not listed on the census), 166 (or about 7.58% of the population) belong to no church, are agnostic or atheist, and 36 individuals (or about 1.64% of the population) did not answer the question.

== Transport ==
Kemmental sits on the Wil–Kreuzlingen line between Weinfelden and Kreuzlingen and is served by the St. Gallen S-Bahn at Siegershausen railway station.

== Education ==
In Kemmental about 77.3% of the population (between age 25-64) have completed either non-mandatory upper secondary education or additional higher education (either university or a Fachhochschule).

Kemmental is home to the Kemmental primary and secondary school district. In the 2008/2009 school year there were 257 students. There were 48 children in the kindergarten, and the average class size was 24 kindergartners. Of the children in kindergarten, 21 or 43.8% were female, 3 or 6.3% were not Swiss citizens and 1 or 2.1% did not speak German natively. The lower and upper primary levels begin at about age 5-6 and last for 6 years. There were 95 children in who were at the lower primary level and 114 children in the upper primary level. The average class size in the primary school was 23.22 students. At the lower primary level, there were 42 children or 44.2% of the total population who were female, 7 or 7.4% were not Swiss citizens and 3 or 3.2% did not speak German natively. In the upper primary level, there were 56 or 49.1% who were female, 12 or 10.5% were not Swiss citizens and 7 or 6.1% did not speak German natively. At the secondary level, students are divided according to performance. The secondary level begins at about age 12 and usually lasts 3 years. 134 teenagers were in special or remedial classes, of which 65 or 48.5% were female, 9 or 6.7% were not Swiss citizens and 8 or 6.0% did not speak German natively.
