= Rabadan =

Coordinates: 46°12′N 9°01′E

Rabadan is a carnival festival that takes place in the town of Bellinzona, capital of southern canton of Ticino in Switzerland.

It is a very lively festival, especially alluring for its spontaneous popular character. It has been ongoing now for more than 150 years. It attracts people from the rest of Switzerland and neighbouring Italy and during its peak evenings tens of thousands of people take to the streets wearing colourful carnival costumes.
