= List of mayors of Bellinzona =

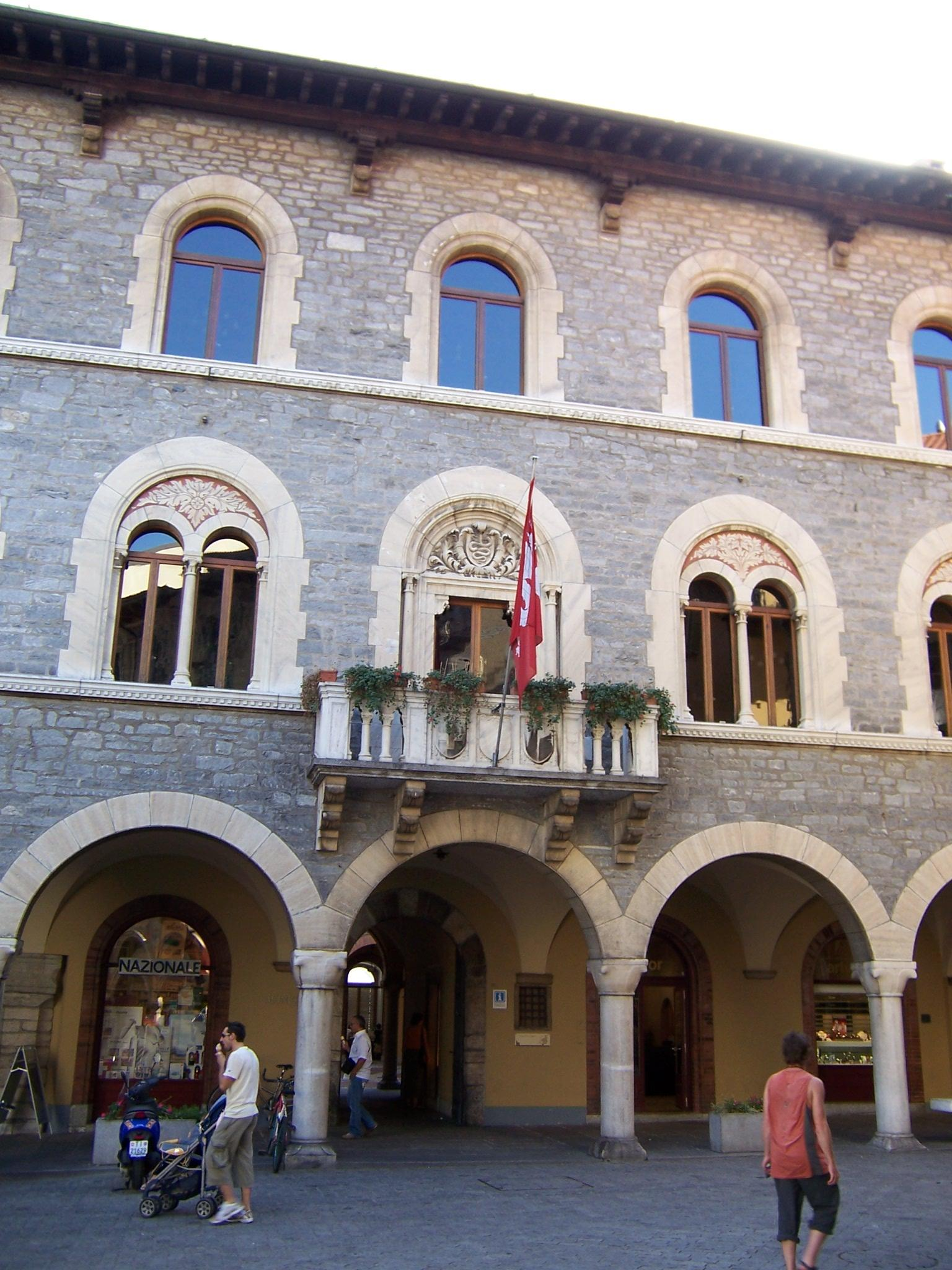
Palazzo comunale in Bellinzona

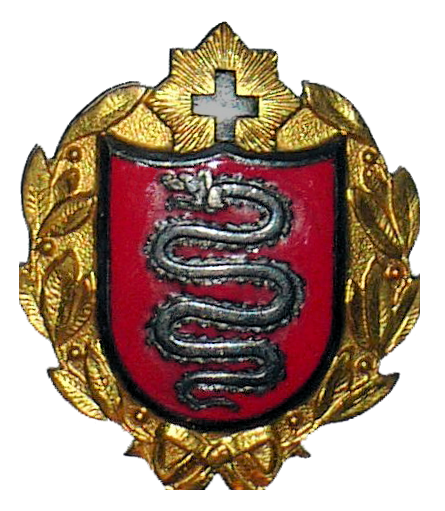
Coat of arms of Bellinzona

This is a list of mayors of the city of Bellinzona, Switzerland. The sindaco chairs the municipio, the executive of Bellinzona.

Mayor (Sindaco) of Bellinzona
Term	Mayor	Lifespan	Party	Notes
1877–1905	Giuseppe Molo	(1831–1905)		
1905–1907	Valentino Molo	(1845–1930)		
1908–1918	Federico Pedotti	(1861–1937)		
1918–1928	Arnaldo Bolla	(1885–1942)		
1928–1940	Carlo Maggini	(1877–1941)		
1940–1963	Pierino Tatti	(1893–1963)		
1963–1968	Sergio Mordasini			
1968–1988	Athos Gallino	(1920–2013)		
1988–2004	Paolo Agustoni	(born 1942)		
2004–2012	Brenno Martignoni	(born 1962)		
2012–present	Mario Branda	(born 1960)	Unità di sinistra	
