= Daniel Panizzolo =

Swiss footballer (born 1986)

Personal information
- Full name: Daniel Panizzolo
- Date of birth: 25 March 1986 (age 40)
- Place of birth: Bellinzona, Switzerland
- Position: Defender

Team information
- Current team: Locarno

Senior career*
Years	Team	Apps	(Gls)
–2005	Lugano		
2005–2006	Genoa		
2006–2010	Prato	94	(4)
2010–2011	Eupen	23	(1)
2011–2013	Locarno		
2014	Sementina		
2014	Bellinzona		
2015	Ravecchia		
2015–	Sementina		
- * Club domestic league appearances and goals as of 6 September 2012

Daniel Panizzolo (born 25 March 1986) is a Swiss footballer who plays for Sementina. Previous clubs include Eupen, Locarno, Prato and Genoa.
