= San Jorio Pass =

- Passo San Jorio
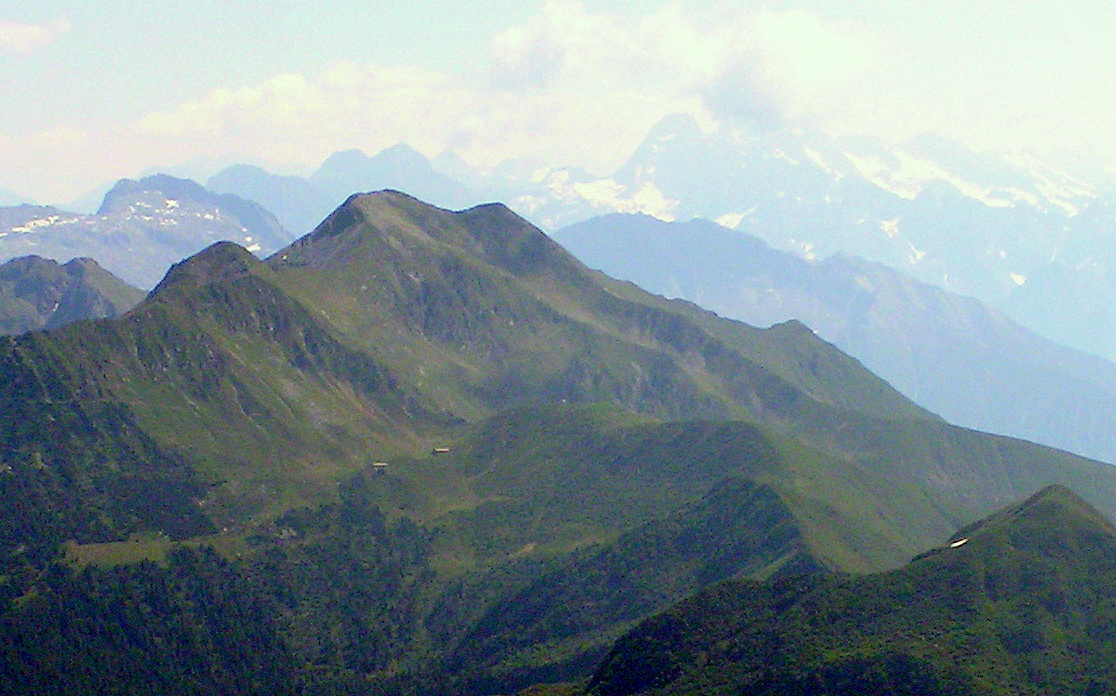

- Location within Switzerland
- Elevation: 2,012 metres (6,601 ft)
- Traversed by: Track

Third Approach
- Location: Ticino, Switzerland; Lombardy, Italy
- Range: Lepontine Alps; Lugano Prealps
- Coordinates: 46°10′0″N 9°9′33″E

The San Jorio Pass, located between the Lepontine Alps and the Lugano Prealps at an altitude of 2,012 metres (6,601 ft) above sea level, connects Garzeno in the Italian province of Como with Carena in the Swiss canton of Ticino. It thus offers a route between the shores of Lake Como and the valley of the Ticino river around Bellinzona.

Although now only traversed by a track, the pass was of strategic importance in earlier times, as one of the roads that connected the lands of Lombardy and Sopraceneri. In the fifteenth century, the pass was exploited by the Visconti rulers of Milan in conflicts over the ownership of Bellinzona. The renovation of the road is referenced by a document of 1465 sent by the merchants of Como to Duke Francesco Sforza mentioning the carriage of provisions, cattle and iron from the mines in the Morobbia valley. The region was fortified in the early twentieth century and during the Second World War.

A road leads to the vicinity of the pass on the Italian side, but the Swiss side is served only by walking trails and cycling routes. Near the summit of the pass is a mediaeval church and three refuge huts. On the first Sunday in August, a religious ceremony is held in the church, along with a folk festival on the pass.
