= Fritz Peter (tenor) =

Swiss operatic tenor

Fritz Peter (7 November 1925 – 8 January 1994) was a Swiss operatic tenor.

== Life and career ==
Born in Camorino, Peter first did an apprenticeship as a mechanical engineer. He then studied singing from 1945 to 1948 with the soprano Annelies Gamper and with Elfriede Lemmer at the Zurich University of the Arts, from 1948 to 1955 with the soprano Margherita Perras in Zurich and then with Vito Frazzi in Siena and with Alphons Fischer in Stuttgart.

From 1955 to 1961, he was engaged at the Städtische Bühne Ulm, where, in addition to roles as a lyric tenor, he also took on roles as a Heldentenor, such as Florestan in Fidelio, Don José in Carmen, Riccardo in Un ballo in maschera and Max in Der Freischütz. He was then engaged at the Stadttheater/Opernhaus Zürich until 1990. There, he sang tenor roles in operas and operettas such as Si j'étais roi, Lulu, Wozzeck, Il matrimonio segreto, Martha Il re cervo, Jenůfa, The Count of Luxembourg, Paganini, Don Giovanni, Die Entführung aus dem Serail, The Magic Flute, The Merry Wives of Windsor, Orpheus in the Underworld, Il barbiere di Siviglia, L'italiana in Algeri, The Bartered Bride, The Gypsy Baron, Die Meistersinger von Nürnberg, Tannhäuser and The Bird Seller.

He sang in the premieres of The Greek Passion by Bohuslav Martinů (1961, director: Herbert Graf, musical director: Paul Sacher), Barbasuk by Paul Burkhard (1961, director: Kurt Wilhelm, musical director: Victor Reinshagen), Madame Bovary by Heinrich Sutermeister (1967, director: Michael Hampe, musical direction: Reinhard Peters) and Ein Engel kommt nach Babylon by Rudolf Kelterborn (1977, director: Götz Friedrich, music director: Ferdinand Leitner).

Peter received invitations to appear as a soloist, for example at the Bayerische Staatsoper, the Oper Frankfurt, the Hamburg State Opera, the Grand Théâtre de Genève, the Theater St. Gallen, the Theater Basel, the Luzerner Theater and the Opéra de Nice. With the ensemble of the Zurich Opera House, he has made guest appearances at la Scala, the Semperoper, the Finnish National Opera and Ballet, the Wiener Festwochen and the Edinburgh Festival.

Peter also performed as a concert singer. He retired in 1990, but continued to appear at Zurich Opera House as a guest in smaller roles until 1993.

Peter died in Oberrieden at the age of 68.

== Recordings ==
- L’incoronazione di Poppea, conductor Nikolaus Harnoncourt, Telefunken, 1979
- Il ritorno d’Ulisse in patria, conductor Nikolaus Harnoncourt, Telefunken, 1980
- auf Zauberwelt Der Oper, Concert Hall: Don Pasquale (Ernesto), Der Freischütz (Max), Tristan und Isolde (Tristan), Die Walküre (Siegmund)
- auf Unsterbliche Operette, Concert Hall: Paganini (Paganini), Viktoria und ihr Husar (Stefan Koltay), Maske in Blau (Armando Cellini), Madame Pompadour (Graf René)
- Der Barbier von Bagdad, conductor Ferdinand Leitner, Profil, 2008
