= Gnosca Observatory =

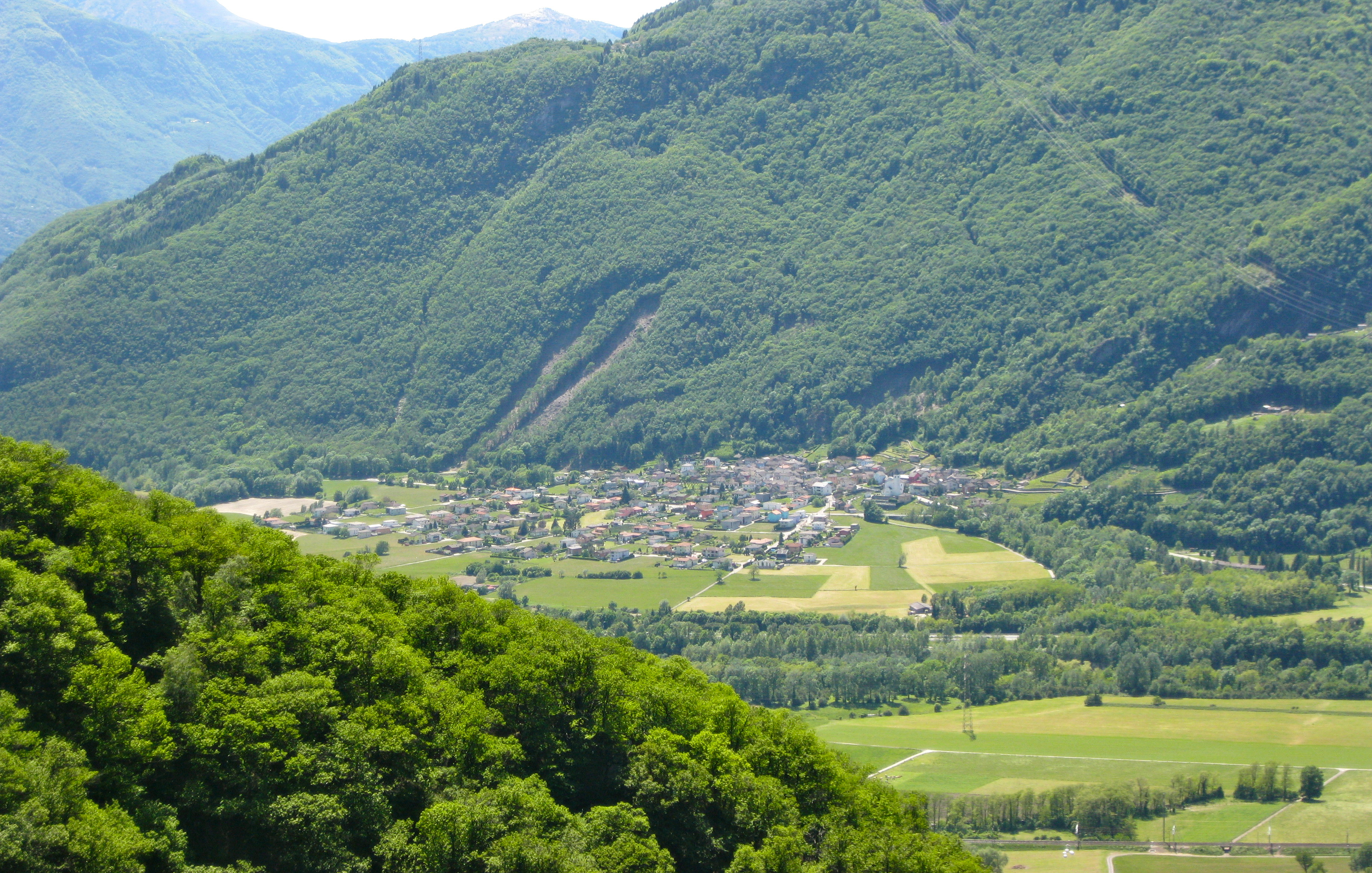
- Organization: private
- Observatory code: 143
- Location: Gnosca, Ticino, Switzerland
- Coordinates: 46°14′4″N 9°1′27″E
- Established: 1998
- Website: sposetti.ch

The Gnosca Observatory (Italian: Osservatorio Astronomico di Gnosca; code: 143) is an astronomical observatory at Gnosca, Ticino, Switzerland. It is owned and operated by amateur astronomer Stefano Sposetti and has the observatory code 143. At Gnosca Observatory, Stefano Sposetti has discovered numerous minor planets (also see Category:Discoveries by Stefano Sposetti).

== See also ==
- List of asteroid-discovering observatories
- List of minor planet discoverers
