= Sementina =

- Former municipality
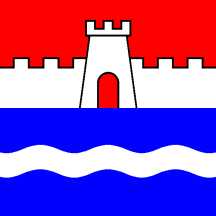
- Flag Coat of arms
- Location of Sementina
- Location within Switzerland Location within Canton of Ticino
- Coordinates: 46°11′N 8°59′E
- Country: Switzerland
- Canton: Ticino
- District: Bellinzona

Government
  - Mayor: Sindaco

Area
  - Total: 8.25 km^{2} (3.19 sq mi)
- Elevation: 224 m (735 ft)

Population (December 2004)
  - Total: 2,827
  - Density: 343/km^{2} (888/sq mi)
- Time zone: UTC+01:00 (CET)
  - Summer (DST): UTC+02:00 (CEST)
- Postal code: 6514
- SFOS number: 5019
- ISO 3166 code: CH-TI
- Surrounded by: Cugnasco, Giubiasco, Gudo, Monte Carasso
- Website: bellinzona.ch

Sementina is a former municipality in the district of Bellinzona in the canton of Ticino in Switzerland. It ceased to exist on 2 April 2017 when it and the municipalities of Camorino, Claro, Giubiasco, Gnosca, Gorduno, Gudo, Moleno, Monte Carasso, Pianezzo, Preonzo, and Sant'Antonio were merged into the municipality of Bellinzona.

== Geography ==
Aerial view (1946)

Sementina has an area, as of 1997, of 8.25 square kilometers (3.19 sq mi). Of this area, 1.61 km^{2} (0.62 sq mi) or 19.5% is used for agricultural purposes, while 5.56 km^{2} (2.15 sq mi) or 67.4% is forested. Of the rest of the land, 0.84 km^{2} (0.32 sq mi) or 10.2% is settled (buildings or roads), 0.21 km^{2} (0.081 sq mi) or 2.5% is either rivers or lakes and 0.26 km^{2} (0.10 sq mi) or 3.2% is unproductive land.

Of the built up area, housing and buildings made up 6.3% and transportation infrastructure made up 2.1%. Out of the forested land, 62.5% of the total land area is heavily forested and 3.4% is covered with orchards or small clusters of trees. Of the agricultural land, 8.0% is used for growing crops, while 5.2% is used for orchards or vine crops and 6.3% is used for alpine pastures. All the water in the municipality is flowing water. Of the unproductive areas, 2.2% is unproductive vegetation.

== Coat of arms ==
The blazon of the municipal coat of arms is Per fess Gules a Wall embatteded throughout with a Towered Gate all Argent and Azure a Bar wavy Argent.

== Demographics ==
Sementina has a population (as of December 2020) of 3,217. As of 2008, 24.7% of the population are foreign nationals. Over the last 10 years (1997–2007) the population has changed at a rate of 15.4%.

Most of the population (as of 2000) speaks Italian(87.2%), with German being second most common (5.1%) and Serbo-Croatian being third (1.6%). Of the Swiss national languages (as of 2000), 136 speak German, 39 people speak French, 2,306 people speak Italian, and 4 people speak Romansh. The remainder (161 people) speak another language.

As of 2008, the gender distribution of the population was 49.0% male and 51.0% female. The population was made up of 1,090 Swiss men (35.8% of the population), and 401 (13.2%) non-Swiss men. There were 1,200 Swiss women (39.5%), and 350 (11.5%) non-Swiss women.

In 2008 there were 19 live births to Swiss citizens and 4 births to non-Swiss citizens, and in same time span there were 11 deaths of Swiss citizens and 3 non-Swiss citizen deaths. Ignoring immigration and emigration, the population of Swiss citizens increased by 8 while the foreign population increased by 1. There were 5 Swiss men and 2 Swiss women who immigrated back to Switzerland. At the same time, there were 10 non-Swiss men and 17 non-Swiss women who immigrated from another country to Switzerland. The total Swiss population change in 2008 (from all sources) was an increase of 47 and the non-Swiss population change was a decrease of 3 people. This represents a population growth rate of 1.5%.

The age distribution, as of 2009, in Sementina is; 329 children or 10.8% of the population are between 0 and 9 years old and 292 teenagers or 9.6% are between 10 and 19. Of the adult population, 326 people or 10.7% of the population are between 20 and 29 years old. 487 people or 16.0% are between 30 and 39, 512 people or 16.8% are between 40 and 49, and 348 people or 11.4% are between 50 and 59. The senior population distribution is 397 people or 13.1% of the population are between 60 and 69 years old, 215 people or 7.1% are between 70 and 79, there are 135 people or 4.4% who are over 80.

As of 2000, there were 1,072 private households in the municipality, and an average of 2.4 persons per household. In 2000 there were 504 single family homes (or 73.6% of the total) out of a total of 685 inhabited buildings. There were 75 two family buildings (10.9%) and 68 multi-family buildings (9.9%). There were also 38 buildings in the municipality that were multipurpose buildings (used for both housing and commercial or another purpose).

The vacancy rate for the municipality, in 2008, was 1%. In 2000 there were 1,253 apartments in the municipality. The most common apartment size was the 4 room apartment of which there were 494. There were 51 single room apartments and 214 apartments with five or more rooms. Of these apartments, a total of 1,062 apartments (84.8% of the total) were permanently occupied, while 155 apartments (12.4%) were seasonally occupied and 36 apartments (2.9%) were empty. As of 2007, the construction rate of new housing units was 9.1 new units per 1000 residents.

The historical population is given in the following table:

year	population
1950	534
1960	618
1970	1,185
1980	2,122
1990	2,394
2000	2,646

== Heritage sites of national significance ==
The Fortificazioni Ottocentesche (also known as the Fortini Della Fame, shared with Camorino and Monte Carasso) and the medieval settlement of S. Defendente are listed as Swiss heritage site of national significance.

== Politics ==
In the 2007 federal election the most popular party was the FDP which received 46.5% of the vote. The next three most popular parties were the CVP (18.2%), the SP (13.55%) and the Ticino League (10.3%). In the federal election, a total of 972 votes were cast, and the voter turnout was 55.7%.

In the 2007 Gran Consiglio election, there were a total of 1,749 registered voters in Sementina, of which 1,329 or 76.0% voted. 22 blank ballots and 2 null ballots were cast, leaving 1,305 valid ballots in the election. The most popular party was the PLRT which received 508 or 38.9% of the vote. The next three most popular parties were; the SSI (with 230 or 17.6%), the PPD+GenGiova (with 192 or 14.7%) and the PS (with 160 or 12.3%).

In the 2007 Consiglio di Stato election, there were 19 blank ballots and 4 null ballots, which left 1,306 valid ballots in the election. The most popular party was the PLRT which received 487 or 37.3% of the vote. The next three most popular parties were; the PPD (with 202 or 15.5%), the SSI (with 197 or 15.1%) and the LEGA (with 182 or 13.9%).

== Economy ==
As of 2007, Sementina had an unemployment rate of 3.98%. As of 2005, there were 61 people employed in the primary economic sector and about 16 businesses involved in this sector. 191 people are employed in the secondary sector and there are 26 businesses in this sector. 460 people are employed in the tertiary sector, with 73 businesses in this sector. There were 1,286 residents of the municipality who were employed in some capacity, of which females made up 43.3% of the workforce.

In 2000, there were 528 workers who commuted into the municipality and 980 workers who commuted away. The municipality is a net exporter of workers, with about 1.9 workers leaving the municipality for every one entering. About 3.6% of the workforce coming into Sementina are coming from outside Switzerland. Of the working population, 6.6% used public transportation to get to work, and 69.1% used a private car.

As of 2009, there was one hotel in Sementina.

== Religion ==
From the 2000 census, 2,119 or 80.1% were Roman Catholic, while 156 or 5.9% belonged to the Swiss Reformed Church. There are 278 individuals (or about 10.51% of the population) who belong to another church (not listed on the census), and 93 individuals (or about 3.51% of the population) did not answer the question.

== Education ==
In Sementina about 65% of the population (between age 25–64) have completed either non-mandatory upper secondary education or additional higher education (either university or a Fachhochschule).

In Sementina there are a total of 542 students (as of 2009). The Ticino education system provides up to three years of non-mandatory kindergarten and in Sementina there are 99 children in kindergarten. The primary school program lasts for five years and includes both a standard school and a special school. In the municipality, 176 students attend the standard primary schools and 13 students attend the special school. In the lower secondary school system, students either attend a two-year middle school followed by a two-year pre-apprenticeship or they attend a four-year program to prepare for higher education. There are 127 students in the two-year middle school and in their pre-apprenticeship, while 50 students are in the four-year advanced program.

The upper secondary school includes several options, but at the end of the upper secondary program, a student will be prepared to enter a trade or to continue on to a university or college. In Ticino, vocational students may either attend school while working on their internship or apprenticeship (which takes three or four years) or may attend school followed by an internship or apprenticeship (which takes one year as a full-time student or one and a half to two years as a part-time student). There are 25 vocational students who are attending school full-time and 47 who attend part-time.

The professional program lasts three years and prepares a student for a job in engineering, nursing, computer science, business, tourism and similar fields. There are 5 students in the professional program.

As of 2000, there were 94 students in Sementina who came from another municipality, while 244 residents attended schools outside the municipality.
