= Preonzo =

- Former municipality
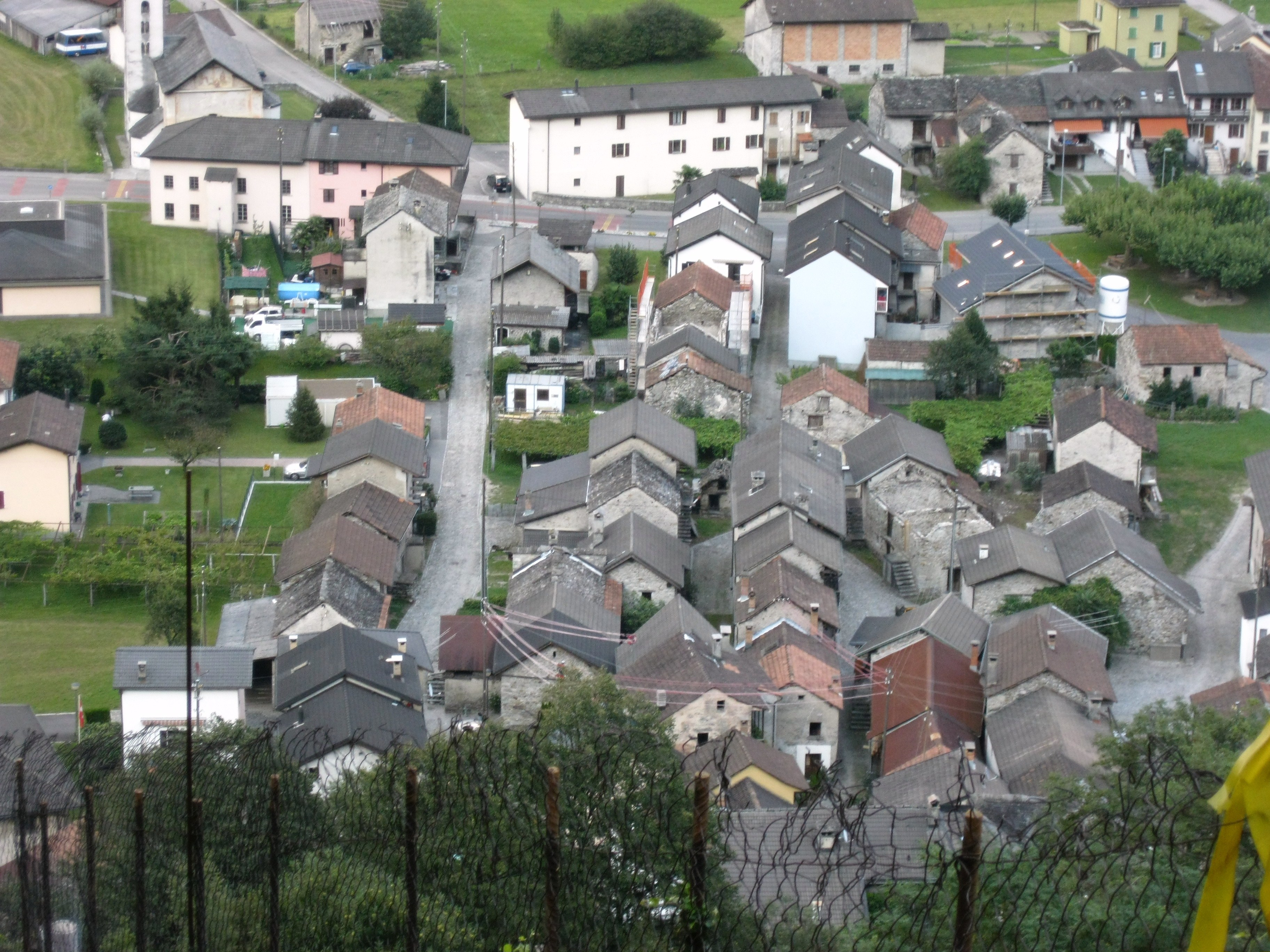
- The old village

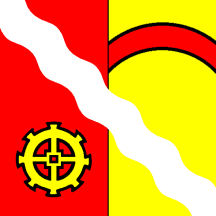
- Flag Coat of arms
- Location of Preonzo
- Location within Switzerland Location within Canton of Ticino
- Coordinates: 46°16′N 9°00′E
- Country: Switzerland
- Canton: Ticino
- District: Bellinzona

Government
  - Mayor: Sindaco

Area
  - Total: 16.45 km^{2} (6.35 sq mi)
- Elevation: 250 m (820 ft)

Population (December 2023)
  - Total: 674
  - Density: 41.0/km^{2} (106/sq mi)
- Time zone: UTC+01:00 (CET)
  - Summer (DST): UTC+02:00 (CEST)
- Postal code: 6523
- SFOS number: 5015
- ISO 3166 code: CH-TI
- Surrounded by: Claro, Cresciano, Cugnasco, Gnosca, Gorduno, Lavertezzo, Lodrino, Moleno, Monte Carasso, Vogorno
- Website: bellinzona.ch

Preonzo is a former municipality in the district of Bellinzona in the canton of Ticino in Switzerland.

On 2 April 2017, the former municipalities of Camorino, Claro, Giubiasco, Gnosca, Gorduno, Moleno, Monte Carasso, Pianezzo, Sant'Antonio and Sementina merged into the municipality of Bellinzona.

== History ==
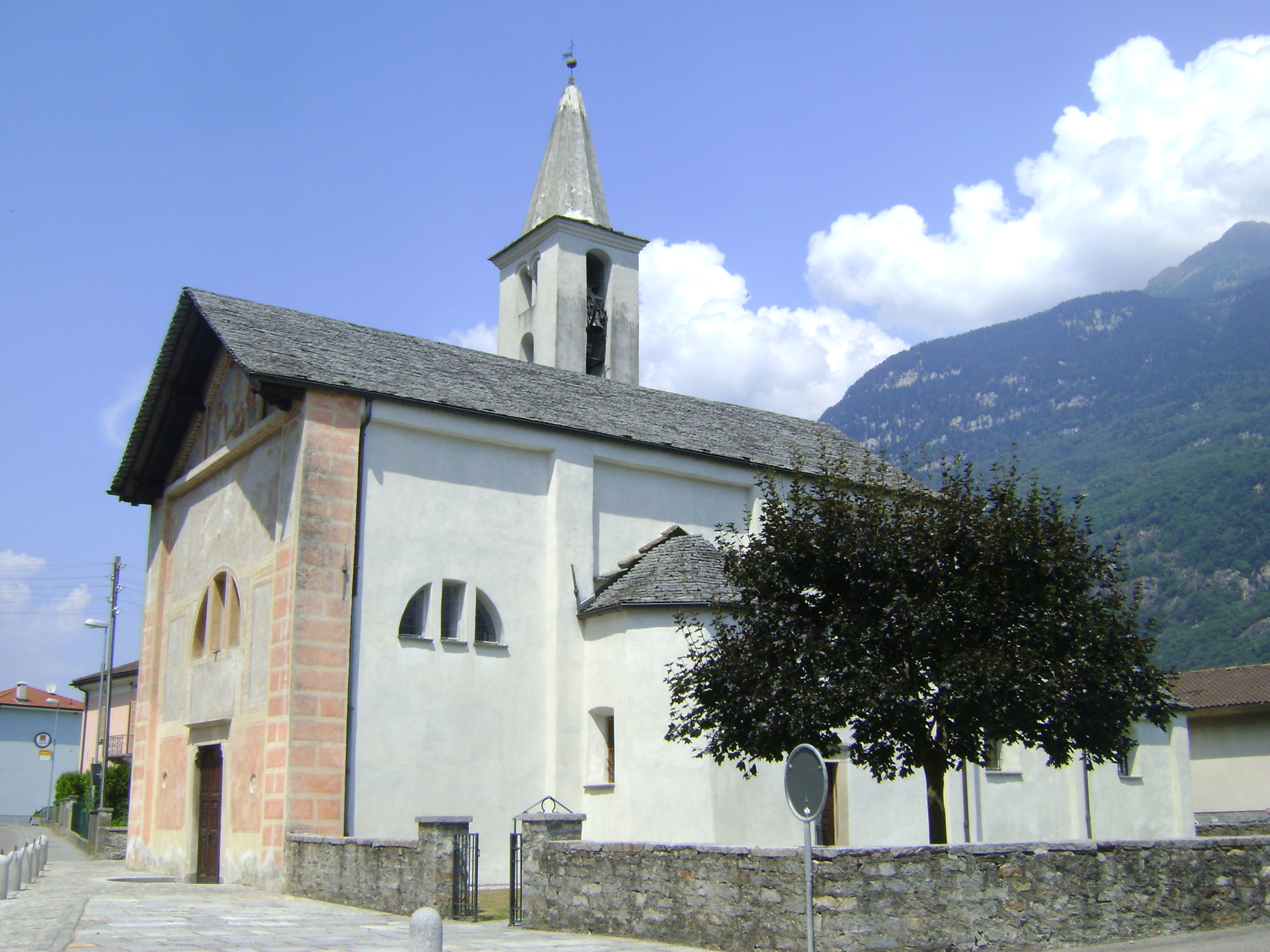
Church of SS Simone e Giuda, built in 1459, rebuilt in the 17th century

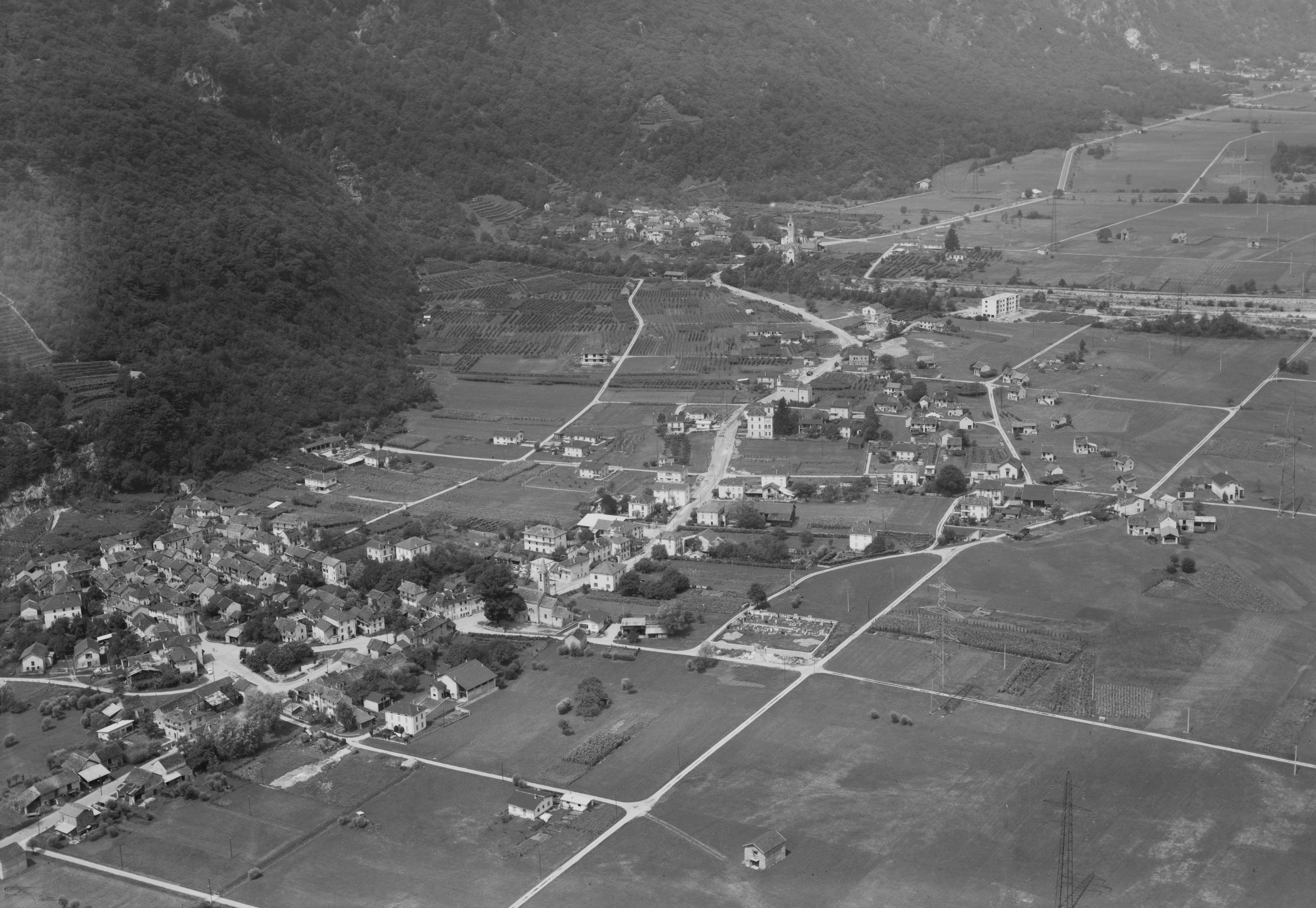
Aerial view (1964)

Preonzo is first mentioned in 1335 as Prevonzo. In the 14th century, Moleno and Preonzo formed a settlement. In 1335 it became a municipality in the County of Bellinzona. During the first conquest of the Ticino in 1403–22, it was ruled by the cantons of Uri and Obwalden. They granted the villages its statutes and customary rights (Statuti, ordini), although, in contrast to Moleno, it was not incorporated in the Levantine.

The parish church of SS Simone e Giuda was built in 1459. In the 17th century it was rebuilt and then renovated in 1963–66 and 1996–97. It broke away from the Church of S. Vittore in Moleno in 1545. Together with Gnosca and Moleno it was one of the three churches that used the Ambrosian Rite in the County of Bellinzona.

Traditionally, the village economy was based mostly on alpine pasturage and agriculture. However, by 2005, only 13% of jobs were in agriculture, while 56% were in manufacturing. More than three-quarters of workers commuted to Biasca and Bellinzona.

== Geography ==
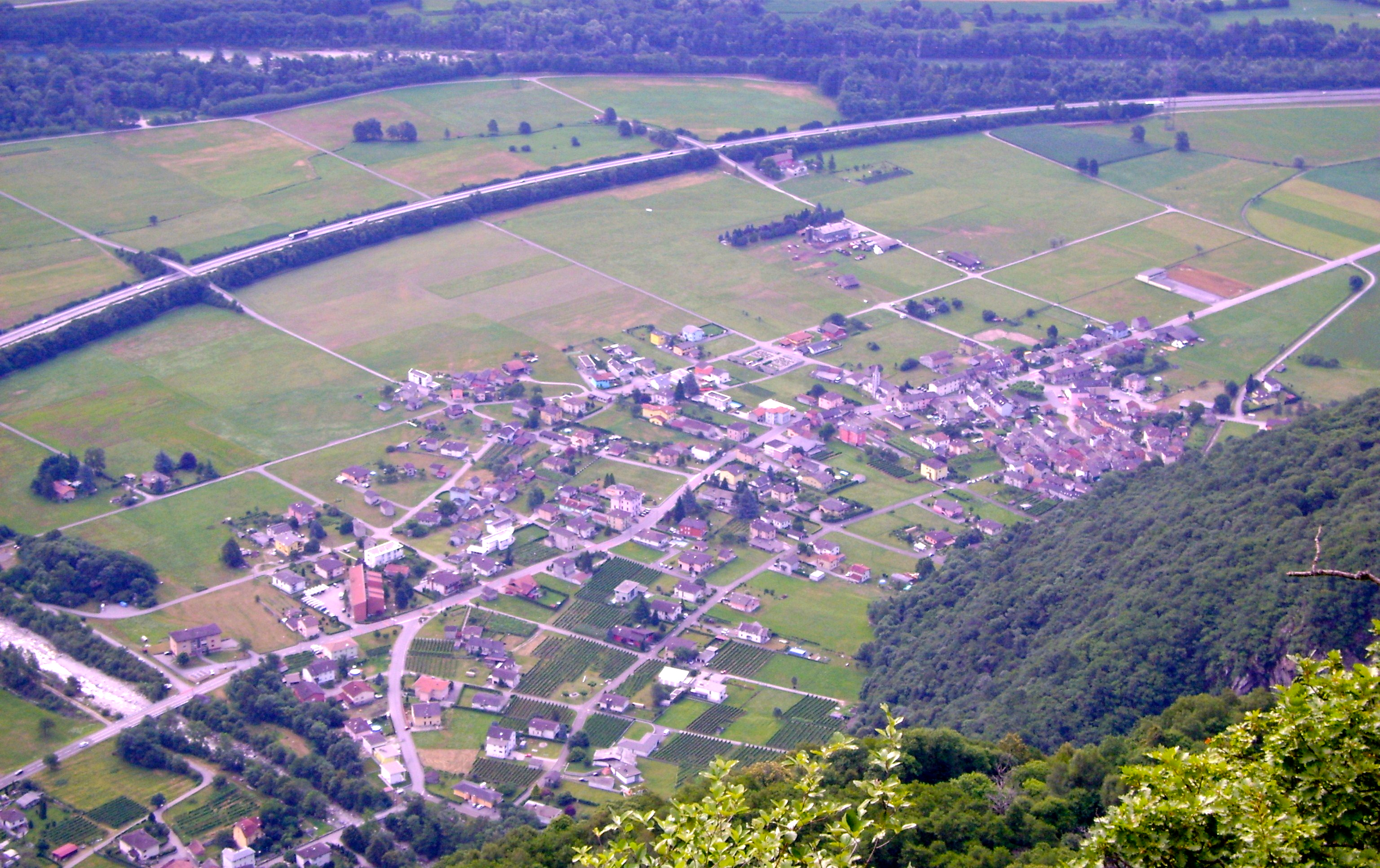
Preonzo from the air

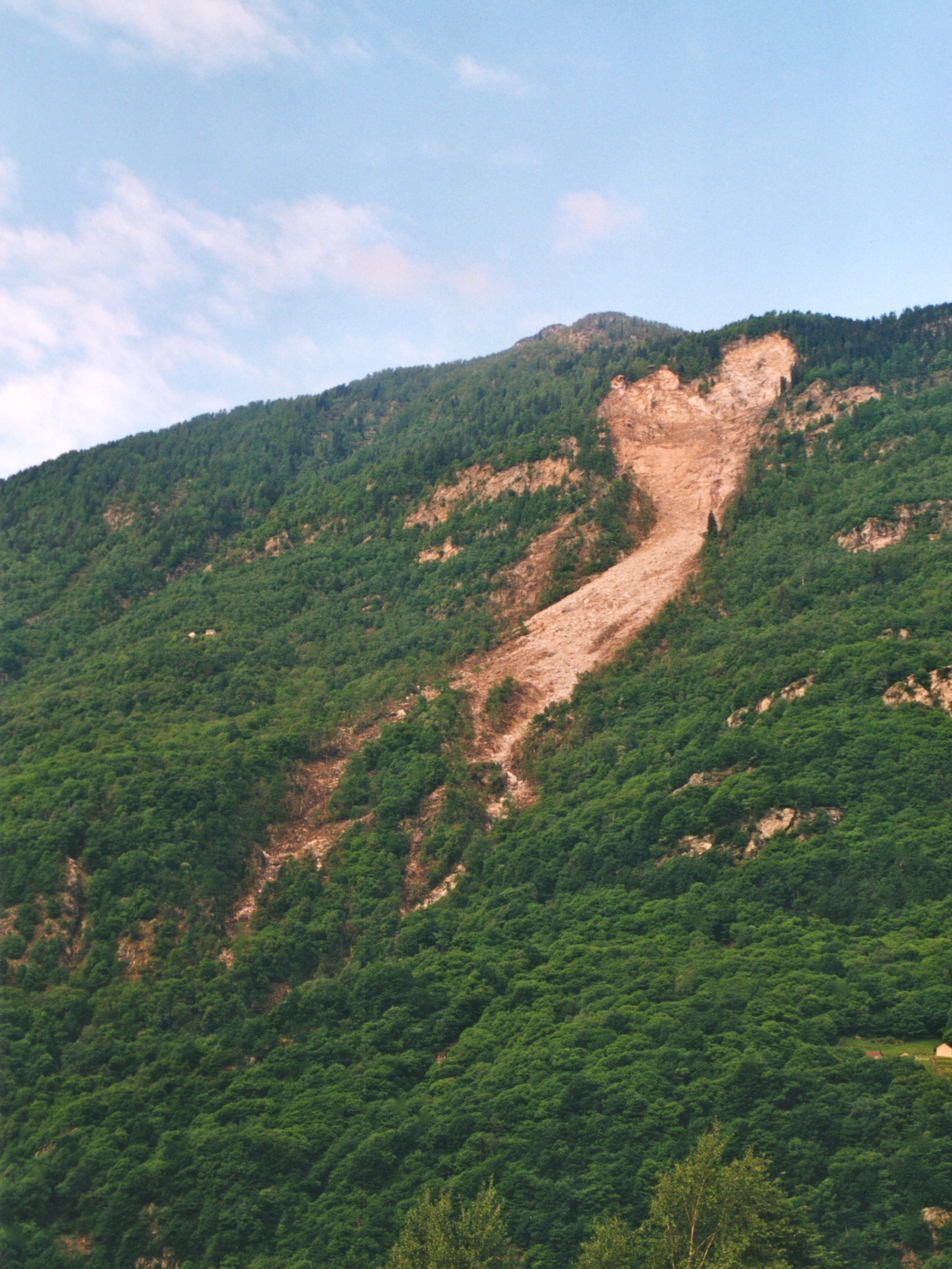
Site of the 2002 rock slide

Preonzo has an area, as of 1997, of 16.44 square kilometers (6.35 sq mi). Of this area, 1.22 km^{2} (0.47 sq mi) or 7.4% is used for agricultural purposes, while 9.93 km^{2} (3.83 sq mi) or 60.4% is forested. Of the rest of the land, 0.55 km^{2} (0.21 sq mi) or 3.3% is settled (buildings or roads), 0.39 km^{2} (0.15 sq mi) or 2.4% is either rivers or lakes and 4.11 km^{2} (1.59 sq mi) or 25.0% is unproductive land.

Of the built up area, housing and buildings made up 1.0% and transportation infrastructure made up 1.5%. Out of the forested land, 44.8% of the total land area is heavily forested, while 15.1% is covered in small trees and shrubbery. Of the agricultural land, 5.7% is used for growing crops. All the water in the municipality is flowing water. Of the unproductive areas, 12.8% is unproductive vegetation and 12.2% is too rocky for vegetation.

The municipality is located in the Bellinzona district, on the right bank of the Ticino river between Bellinzona and Biasca.

=== The rockslide of Valegión ===
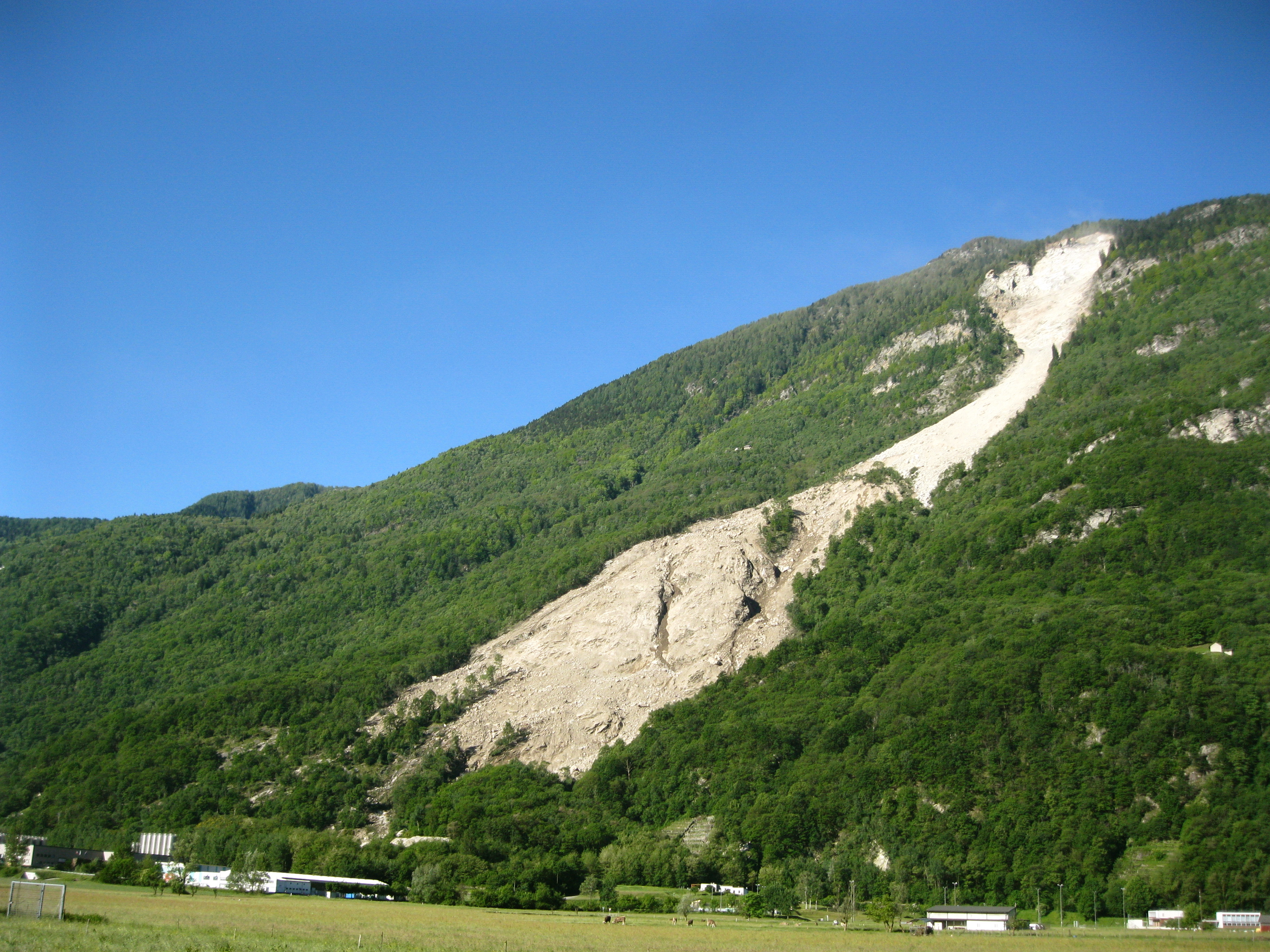
Results of the 17 May 2012 rockslide

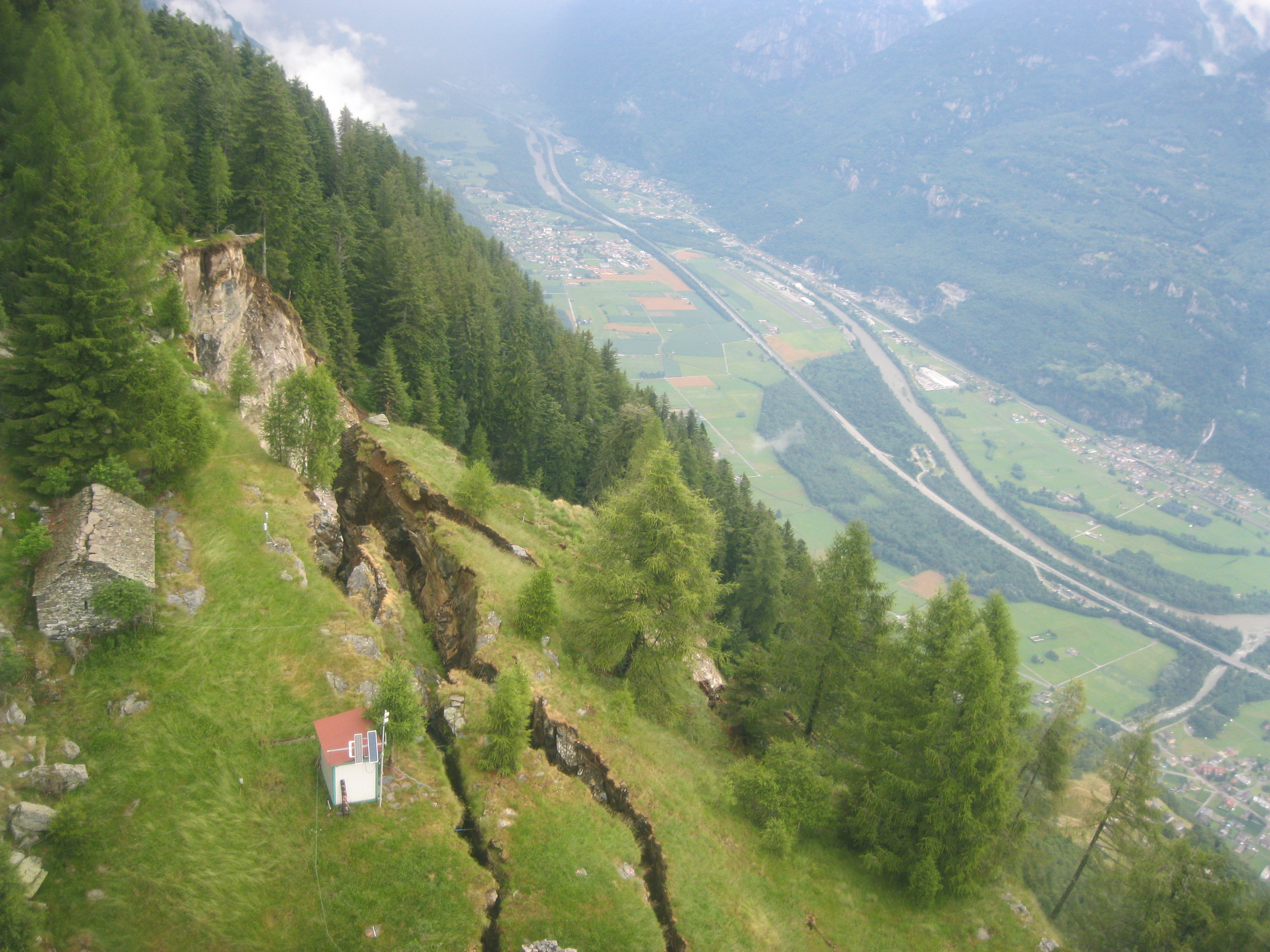
Fractures from the 6 June 2012 rockslide

The rock wall ("Valegión", "Purscì") at Alpe di Roscioro (or Roscèro) at 1,517 m (4,977 ft) above sea level about 2,000 m (6,600 ft) from the Preonzo industrial park has collapsed several times in the past centuries. In 1702, 1725, and 1747, rock slides and debris destroyed parts of the old town, and boulders have been found over 400 m (1,300 ft) from the base of the slope.

In the 1970s, a small retaining wall for 3,000 m^{3} (3,900 cu yd) of rock was built in preparation for construction of the motorway in the following decade. In 1998, the industrial park expanded and another, larger retaining wall with a capacity of between 15,000 m^{3} (20,000 cu yd) and 20,000 m^{3} (26,000 cu yd) was built. Between 1999 and 2003, a number of sensors were placed on the rock wall to study factors leading up to rock slides.

In 2001, two landslides descended from the "Riale Valegión":

- The first, in June, (between 25,000 m^{3} (33,000 cu yd) and 28,000 m^{3} (37,000 cu yd)) filled the retaining walls and flooded the industrial park.
- The second, in July, (20,000 m^{3} (26,000 cu yd)) was mostly stopped by the retaining walls, but the slide flowed into part of the industrial area.

These events induced the authorities to increase the capacity of the largest retaining wall from 20,000 m^{3} (26,000 cu yd) to about 70,000 m^{3} (92,000 cu yd). The retaining wall was completed in the end of 2002. On 7–8 May 2002, about 150,000 m^{3} (200,000 cu yd) of rock fell over 7 hours during heavy rain from Roscioro. Only a few boulders reached the partly completed retaining wall. During the night of 14–15 May 2012, there was a major rockslide above Preonzo which resulted in no deaths or damaged buildings, but did cause road closures (at intervals even the motorway). About 300,000 m^{3} (390,000 cu yd) of rock collapsed on 14–15 May with another 500,000 m^{3} (650,000 cu yd) of rock that could potentially fall in future.

== Coat of arms ==
The blazon of the municipal coat of arms is Per pale Gules in base a Mill Wheel Or and of the last in chief a Bar embowed of the first and overall a Bend wavy Argent.

== Demographics ==
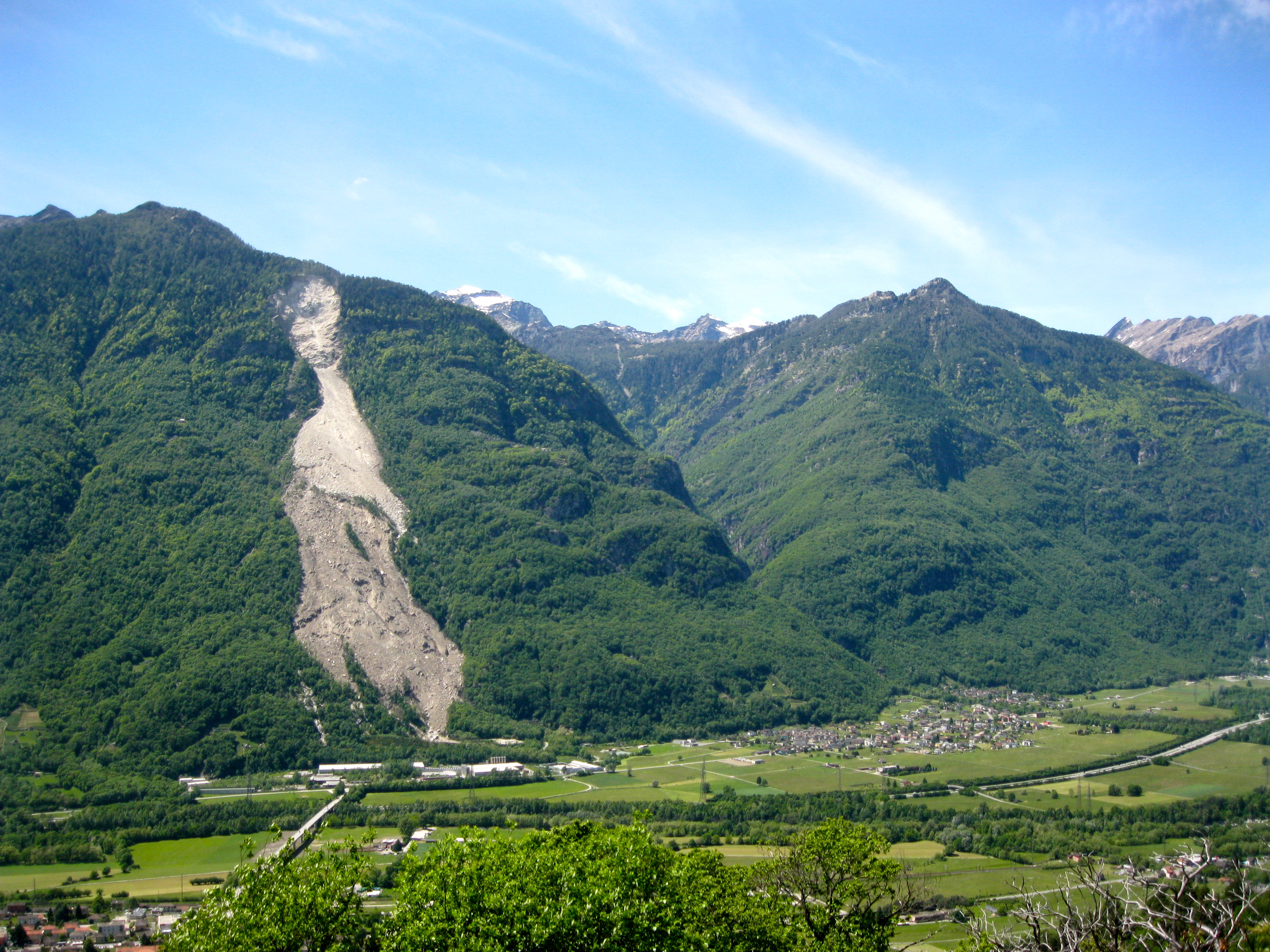
Preonzo village at the foot of the mountains

Preonzo has a population (as of December 2020) of 614. As of 2008, 11.9% of the population are foreign nationals. Over the last 10 years (1997–2007) the population has changed at a rate of 20.8%.

Most of the population (as of 2000) speaks Italian (91.9%), with German being second most common ( 5.2%) and French being third ( 1.2%). Of the Swiss national languages (as of 2000), 25 speak German, six people speak French, 445 people speak Italian, and one person speaks Romansh. The remainder (7 people) speak another language.

As of 2008, the gender distribution of the population was 49.7% male and 50.3% female. The population was made up of 244 Swiss men (43.3% of the population), and 36 (6.4%) non-Swiss men. There were 259 Swiss women (46.0%), and 24 (4.3%) non-Swiss women.

In 2008, there were three live births to Swiss citizens and two births to non-Swiss citizens, and in same time span there were five deaths of Swiss citizens. Ignoring immigration and emigration, the population of Swiss citizens decreased by two while the foreign population increased by two. There was one Swiss man who emigrated from Switzerland. At the same time, there was one non-Swiss man who emigrated from Switzerland to another country and one non-Swiss woman who immigrated from another country to Switzerland. The total Swiss population change in 2008 (from all sources) was a decrease of 13 and the non-Swiss population change was an increase of three people. This represents a population growth rate of −1.7%.

The age distribution, as of 2009, in Preonzo is; 51 children or 9.1% of the population are between zero and nine years-old and 65 teenagers or 11.5% are between 10 and 19. Of the adult population, 63 people or 11.2% of the population are between 20 and 29 years old. 85 people or 15.1% are between 30 and 39, 94 people or 16.7% are between 40 and 49, and 73 people or 13.0% are between 50 and 59. The senior population distribution is 68 people or 12.1% of the population are between 60 and 69 years old, 43 people or 7.6% are between 70 and 79, there are 21 people or 3.7% who are over 80.

As of 2000, there were 195 private households in the municipality, and an average of 2.5 persons per household. In 2000 there were 163 single family homes (or 76.5% of the total) out of a total of 213 inhabited buildings. There were 36 two family buildings (16.9%) and five multi-family buildings (2.3%). There were also 9 buildings in the municipality that were multipurpose buildings (used for both housing and commercial or another purpose).

The vacancy rate for the municipality, in 2008, was 0%. In 2000 there were 277 apartments in the municipality. The most common apartment size was the four room apartment of which there were 101. There were 14 single room apartments and 69 apartments with five or more rooms. Of these apartments, a total of 195 apartments (70.4% of the total) were permanently occupied, while 77 apartments (27.8%) were seasonally occupied and five apartments (1.8%) were empty. As of 2007, the construction rate of new housing units was 3.5 new units per 1000 residents.

The historical population is given in the following table:

year	population
1850	402
1900	315
1950	347
1980	405
1990	396
2000	484

== Sights ==
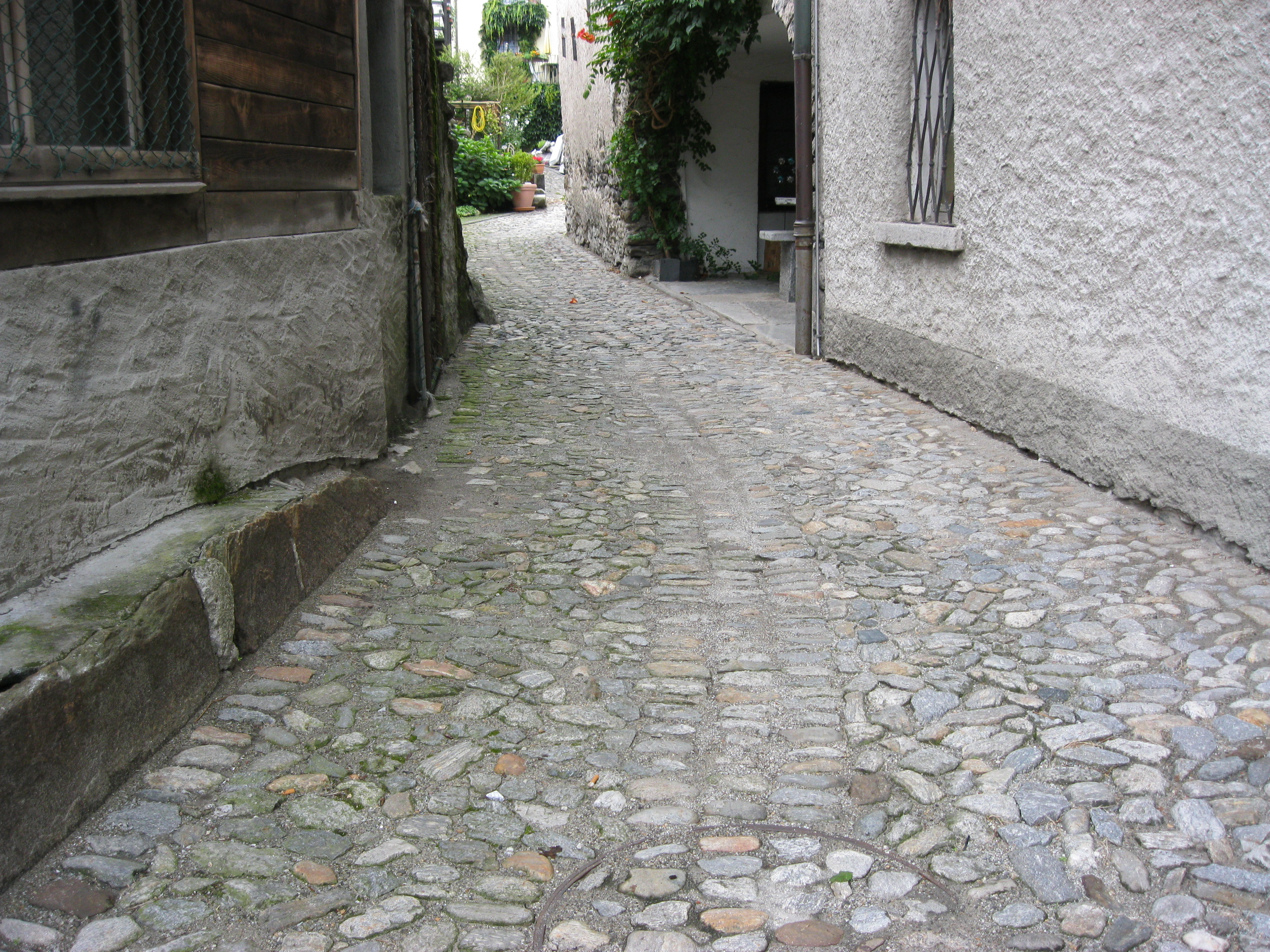
Paved street in the center of Preonzo

The entire village of Preonzo is designated as part of the Inventory of Swiss Heritage Sites

== Politics ==
In the 2007 federal election, the most popular party was the FDP which received 47.61% of the vote. The next three most popular parties were the SP (18.76%), the CVP (14.6%) and the Ticino League (10.83%). In the federal election, a total of 229 votes were cast, and the voter turnout was 53.8%.

In the 2007 Gran Consiglio election, there were a total of 420 registered voters in Preonzo, of which 298 or 71.0% voted. Five blank ballots and one null ballot were cast, leaving 292 valid ballots in the election. The most popular party was the PLRT which received 123 or 42.1% of the vote. The next three most popular parties were; the PS (with 45 or 15.4%), the PS (with 45 or 15.4%) and the PPD+GenGiova (with 33 or 11.3%).

In the 2007, Consiglio di Stato election, there were five blank ballots, which left 294 valid ballots in the election. The most popular party was the PLRT which received 123 or 41.8% of the vote. The next three most popular parties were; the PS (with 57 or 19.4%), the LEGA (with 41 or 13.9%) and the SSI (with 36 or 12.2%).

== Economy ==
As of 2007, Preonzo had an unemployment rate of 3.25%. As of 2005, there were 19 people employed in the primary economic sector and about 10 businesses involved in this sector. Eighty-two people are employed in the secondary sector and there are nine businesses in this sector. Forty-five people are employed in the tertiary sector, with 15 businesses in this sector. There were 215 residents of the municipality who were employed in some capacity, of which females made up 37.7% of the workforce.

In 2000, there were 72 workers who commuted into the municipality and 175 workers who commuted away. The municipality is a net exporter of workers, with about 2.4 workers leaving the municipality for every one entering. About 5.6% of the workforce coming into Preonzo are coming from outside Switzerland. Of the working population, 11.6% used public transportation to get to work, and 73.5% used a private car.

== Religion ==
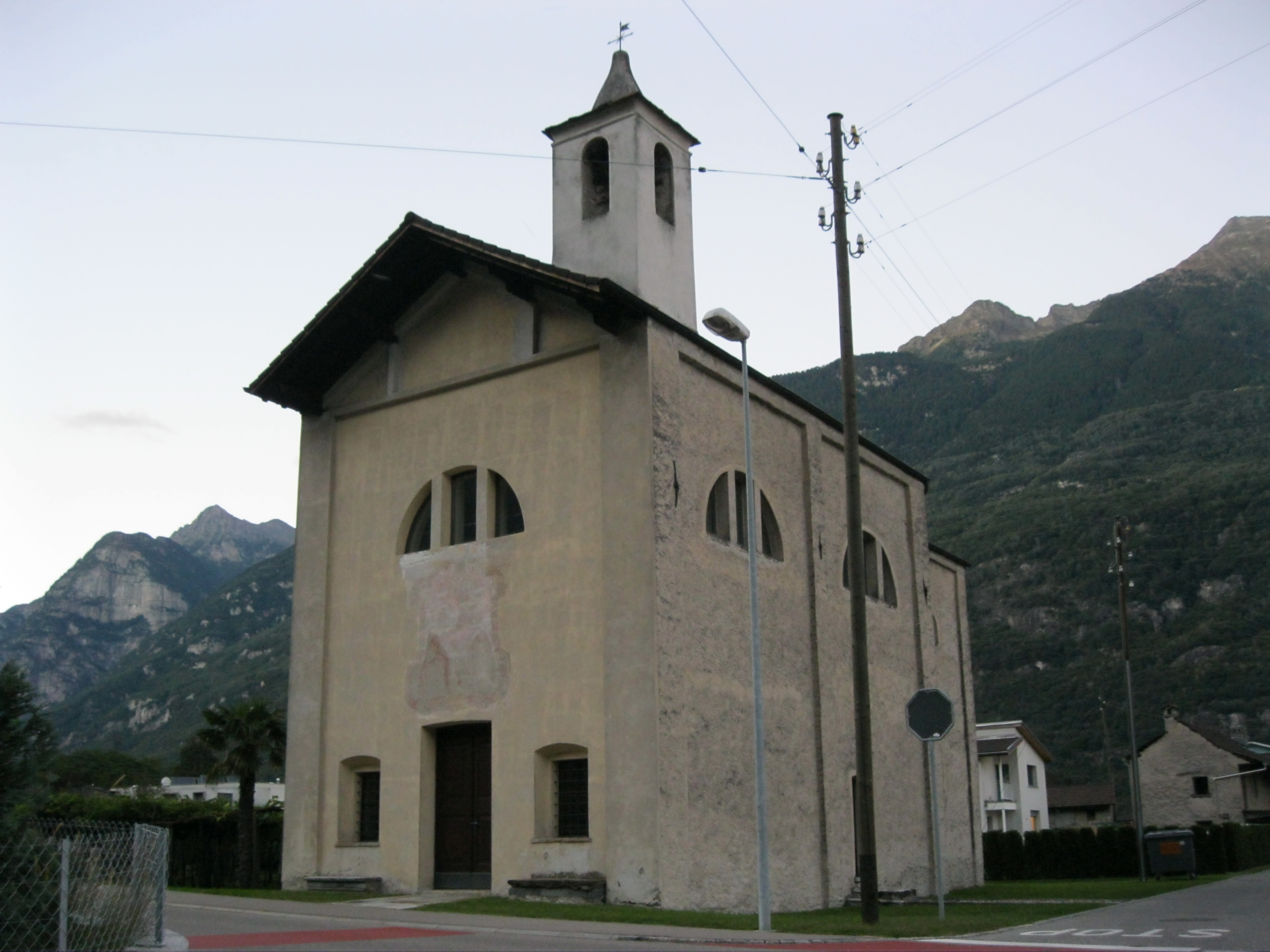
Church of the Madonna, in Preonzo

From the 2000 census, 396 or 81.8% were Roman Catholic, while 25 or 5.2% belonged to the Swiss Reformed Church. There are 53 individuals (or about 10.95% of the population) who belong to another church (not listed on the census), and 10 individuals (or about 2.07% of the population) did not answer the question.

== Education ==
In Preonzo, about 76.2% of the population (between ages 25 and 64) have completed either non-mandatory upper secondary education or additional higher education (either university or a Fachhochschule).

In Preonzo, there are a total of 107 students (as of 2009). The Ticino education system provides up to three years of non-mandatory kindergarten and in Preonzo there are 16 children in kindergarten. The primary school program lasts for five years and includes both a standard school and a special school. In the municipality, 29 students attend the standard primary schools and students attend the special school. In the lower secondary school system, students either attend a two-year middle school followed by a two-year pre-apprenticeship or they attend a four-year program to prepare for higher education. There are 31 students in the two-year middle school and in their pre-apprenticeship, while seven students are in the four-year advanced program.

The upper secondary school includes several options, but at the end of the upper secondary program, a student will be prepared to enter a trade or to continue on to a university or college. In Ticino, vocational students may either attend school while working on their internship or apprenticeship (which takes three or four years) or may attend school followed by an internship or apprenticeship (which takes one year as a full-time student or one and a half to two years as a part-time student). There are 8 vocational students who are attending school full-time and 15 who attend part-time.

The professional program lasts three years and prepares a student for a job in engineering, nursing, computer science, business, tourism and similar fields. There was one student in the professional program.

As of 2000, there were 20 students in Preonzo who came from another municipality, while 45 residents attended schools outside the municipality.
