= Moleno =

- Former municipality
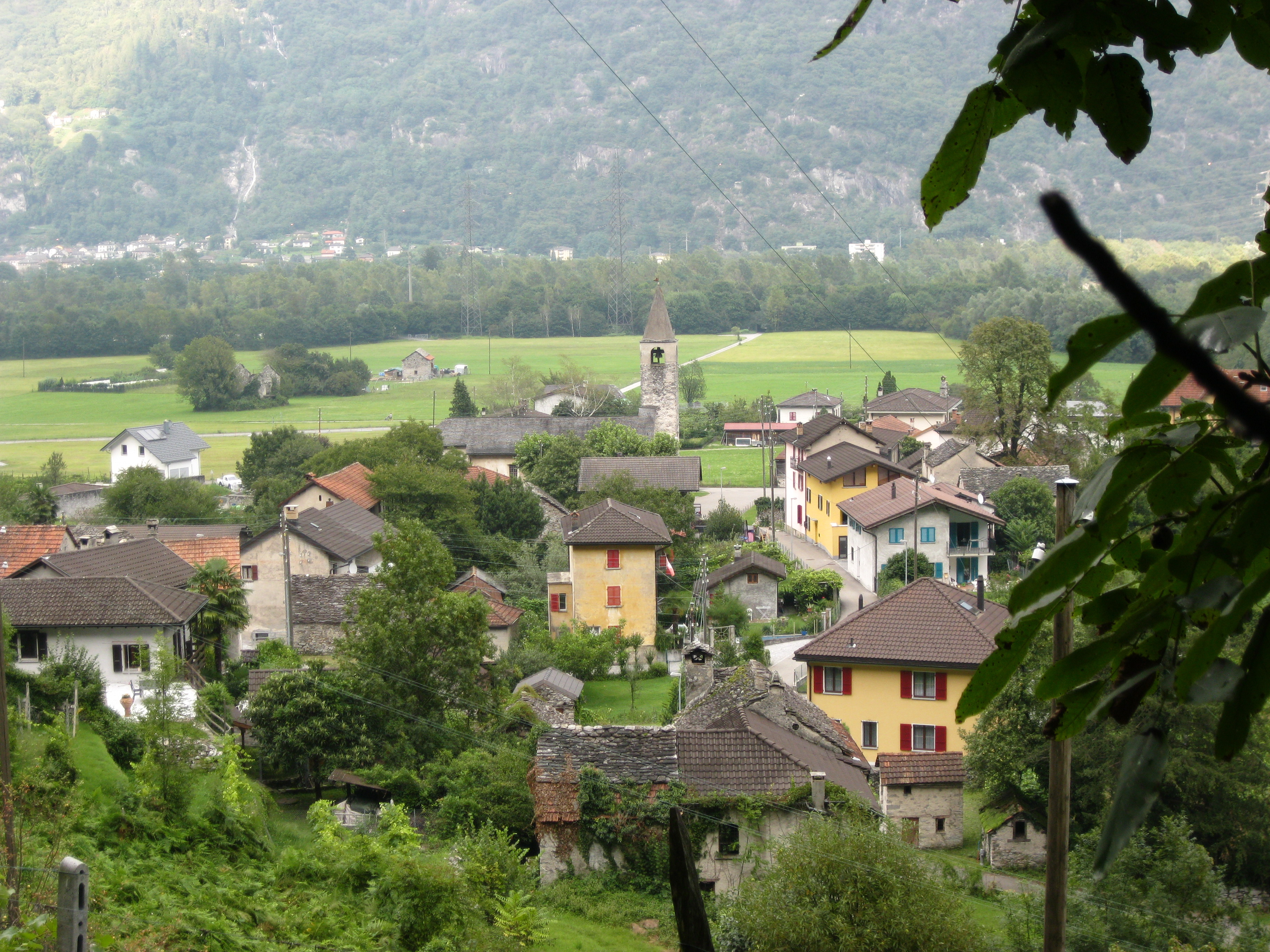
- Moleno village

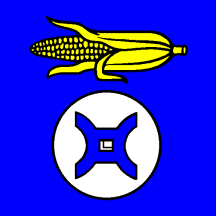
- Flag Coat of arms
- Location of Moleno
- Location within Switzerland Location within Canton of Ticino
- Coordinates: 46°16′N 9°00′E
- Country: Switzerland
- Canton: Ticino
- District: Bellinzona

Government
  - Mayor: Sindaco

Area
  - Total: 7.49 km^{2} (2.89 sq mi)
- Elevation: 270 m (890 ft)

Population (December 2004)
  - Total: 110
  - Density: 15/km^{2} (38/sq mi)
- Time zone: UTC+01:00 (CET)
  - Summer (DST): UTC+02:00 (CEST)
- Postal code: 6524
- SFOS number: 5012
- ISO 3166 code: CH-TI
- Surrounded by: Cresciano, Lodrino, Preonzo
- Website: bellinzona.ch

Moleno is a former municipality in the district of Bellinzona in the canton of Ticino in Switzerland.

On 2 April 2017 the former municipalities of Camorino, Claro, Giubiasco, Gnosca, Gorduno, Gudo, Monte Carasso, Pianezzo, Preonzo, Sant'Antonio and Sementina merged into the municipality of Bellinzona.

== History ==
Moleno is first mentioned in 1213, though this comes from a copy from 1588. In 1256 it was mentioned as a Rivo de Moline. During the Middle Ages, the water running from the Moleno valley formed the southern boundary of the Levantine valley. In 1335, it became part of the County of Bellinzona. In 1396, its territory was combined with Preonzo, to form a single village community. In 1403–22 it was part of the Uri and Obwalden dominated Levantine district. This situation lasted until Bellinzona moved against the Confederates. During these years, the confederation officers recognized, the rights and customary law of Moleno and Preonzo.

The parish church of S. Vittore was built in the 13th century. In the 15th century it was rebuilt and in 1542, it broke away from the church at Biasca. Moleno, Gnosca and Preonzo were the three municipalities in the district of Bellinzona where the Ambrosian Rite was followed in the churches.

In the past, the economy was dominated by farming and alpine herding. However, in 2000, two thirds of the workforce commuted (especially to Biasca and Bellinzona).

== Geography ==
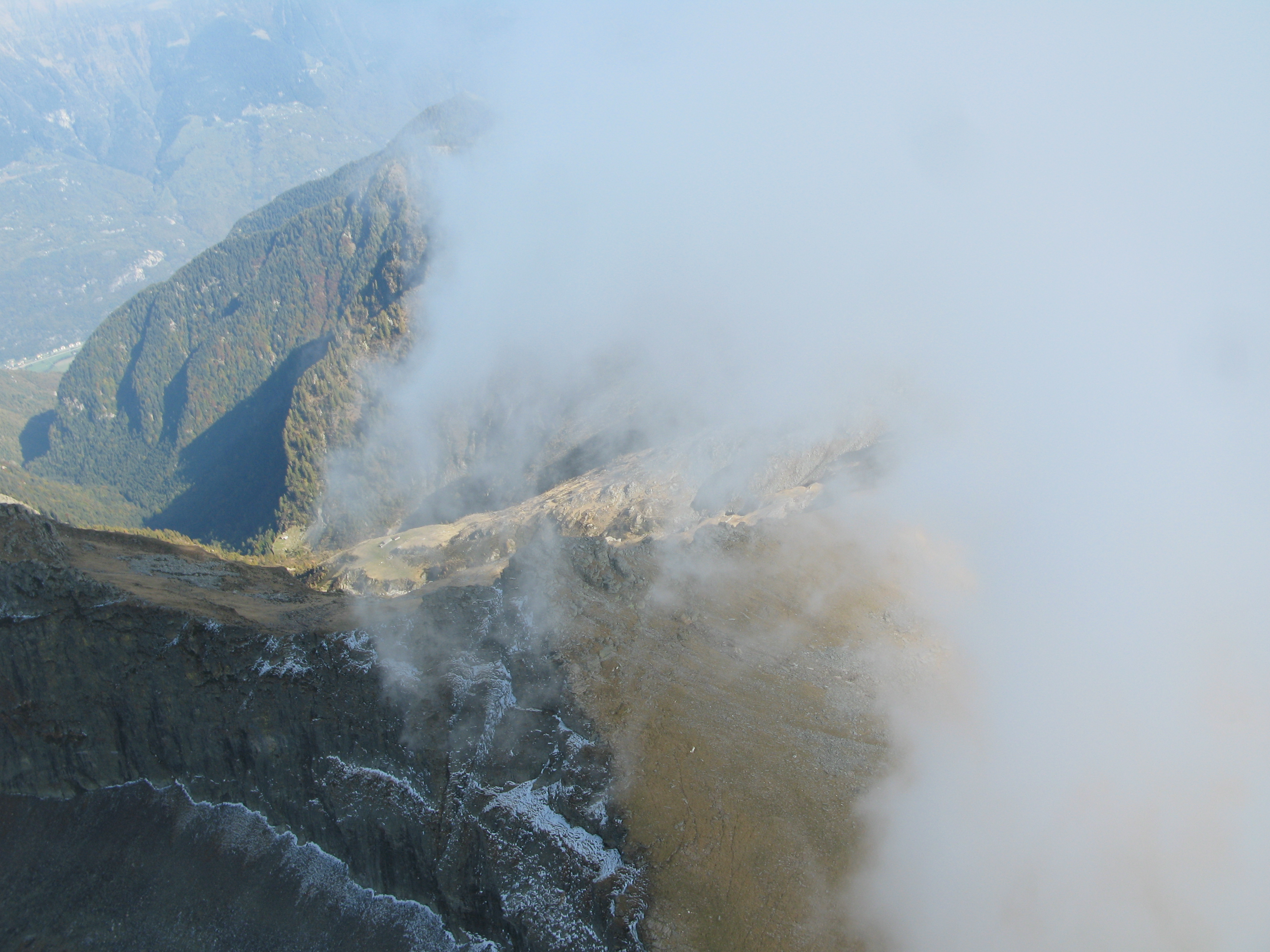
Clouds over the Moleno valley

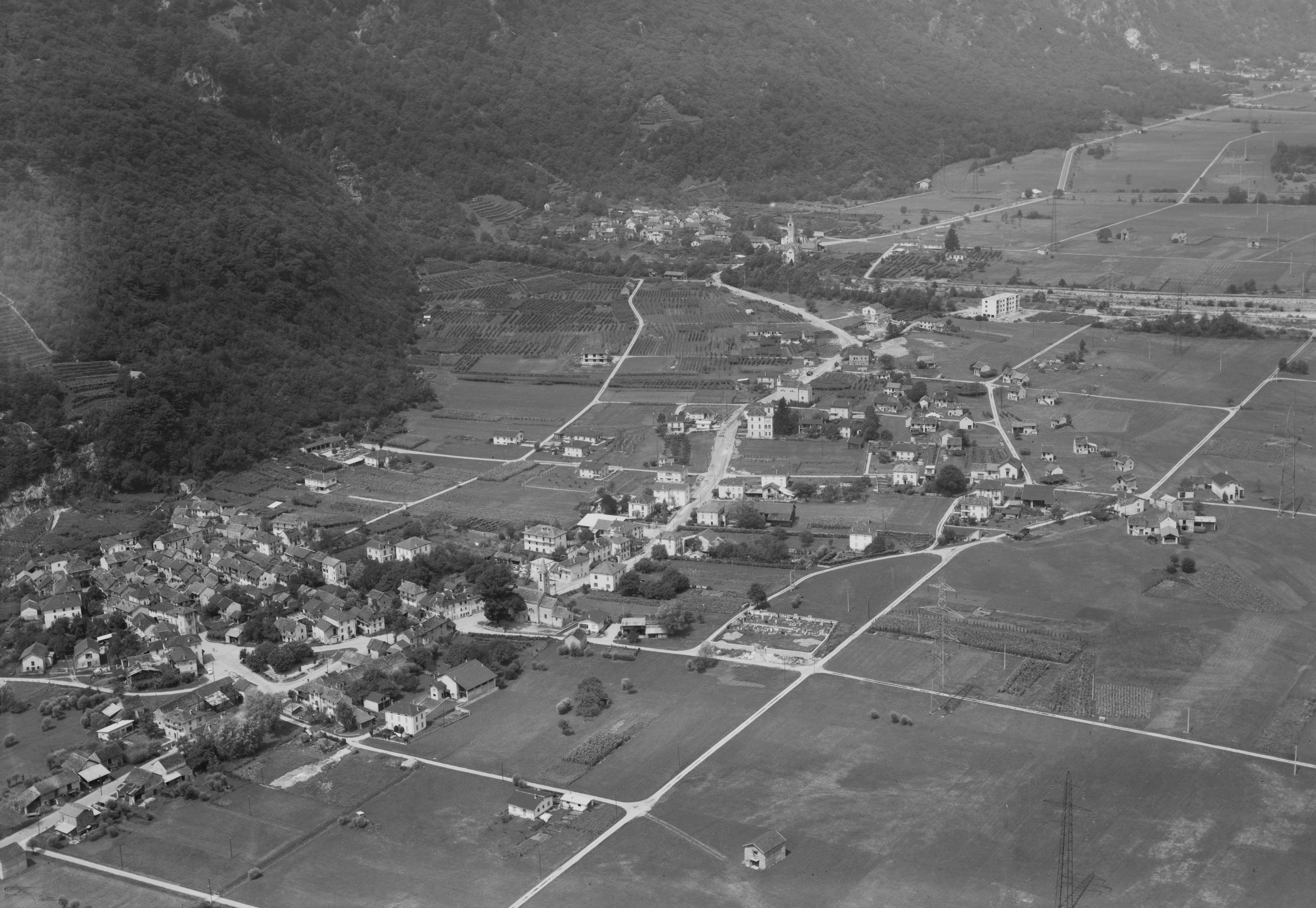
Aerial view (1964)

Moleno has an area, as of 1997, of 7.49 square kilometers (2.89 sq mi). Of this area, 0.53 km^{2} (0.20 sq mi) or 7.1% is used for agricultural purposes, while 5.94 km^{2} (2.29 sq mi) or 79.3% is forested. Of the rest of the land, 0.25 km^{2} (0.097 sq mi) or 3.3% is settled (buildings or roads), 0.14 km^{2} (35 acres) or 1.9% is either rivers or lakes and 0.57 km^{2} (0.22 sq mi) or 7.6% is unproductive land.

Of the built up area, housing and buildings made up 0.9% and transportation infrastructure made up 2.0%. Out of the forested land, 70.4% of the total land area is heavily forested and 1.2% is covered with orchards or small clusters of trees. Of the agricultural land, 5.9% is used for growing crops. All the water in the municipality is flowing water. Of the unproductive areas, 4.7% is unproductive vegetation and 2.9% is too rocky for vegetation.

The municipality is located in the Bellinzona district, on the northern border of the district.

== Coat of arms ==
The blazon of the municipal coat of arms is Azure in chief a maize cob fesswise Or and in base a Millstone Argent with Fer-de-Moline of the first. The millstone alludes to the name of the municipality (mill = mulino in Italian).

== Demographics ==
Moleno has a population (as of December 2020) of 123. As of 2008, 17.0% of the population are foreign nationals. Over the last 10 years (1997–2007) the population has changed at a rate of 10.7%.

Most of the population (as of 2000) speaks Italian(90.5%), with German being second most common ( 6.7%) and French being third ( 1.9%). Of the Swiss national languages (as of 2000), 7 speak German, 2 people speak French, 95 people speak Italian. The remainder (1 person) speaks another language.

As of 2008, the gender distribution of the population was 52.6% male and 47.4% female. The population was made up of 48 Swiss men (41.4% of the population), and 13 (11.2%) non-Swiss men. There were 49 Swiss women (42.2%), and 6 (5.2%) non-Swiss women. In 2008 the total Swiss population change (from all sources) was a decrease of 0 and the non-Swiss population change was a decrease of 2 people. This represents a population growth rate of −1.8%.

The age distribution, as of 2009, in Moleno is; 4 children or 3.4% of the population are between 0 and 9 years old and 14 teenagers or 12.1% are between 10 and 19. Of the adult population, 15 people or 12.9% of the population are between 20 and 29 years old. 13 people or 11.2% are between 30 and 39, 22 people or 19.0% are between 40 and 49, and 20 people or 17.2% are between 50 and 59. The senior population distribution is 11 people or 9.5% of the population are between 60 and 69 years old, 8 people or 6.9% are between 70 and 79, there are 9 people or 7.8% who are over 80.

As of 2000, there were 41 private households in the municipality, and an average of 2.6 persons per household. In 2000 there were 52 single family homes (or 85.2% of the total) out of a total of 61 inhabited buildings. There were 6 two family buildings (9.8%) and 1 multi-family building (1.6%). There were also 2 buildings in the municipality that were multipurpose buildings (used for both housing and commercial or another purpose).

The vacancy rate for the municipality, in 2008, was 0%. In 2000 there were 69 apartments in the municipality. The most common apartment size was the 5 room apartment of which there were 23. There were 7 single room apartments and 23 apartments with five or more rooms. Of these apartments, a total of 41 apartments (59.4% of the total) were permanently occupied, while 28 apartments (40.6%) were seasonally occupied. As of 2007, the construction rate of new housing units was 0 new units per 1000 residents.

The historical population is given in the following table:

year	population
1850	145
1900	111
1950	78
1990	76
2000	105

== Sights ==
The entire village of Moleno is designated as part of the Inventory of Swiss Heritage Sites

== Politics ==
In the 2007 federal election the most popular party was the SP which received 41.82% of the vote. The next three most popular parties were the FDP (35.22%), the Green Party (8.81%) and the CVP (6.92%). In the federal election, a total of 45 votes were cast, and the voter turnout was 57.7%.

In the 2007 Gran Consiglio election, there were a total of 73 registered voters in Moleno, of which 54 or 74.0% voted. The most popular party was the PS which received 19 or 35.2% of the vote. The next three most popular parties were; the PLRT (with 11 or 20.4%), the SSI (with 10 or 18.5%) and the LEGA (with 4 or 7.4%).

In the 2007 Consiglio di Stato election, there were 54 valid ballots in the election. The most popular party was the PS which received 21 or 38.9% of the vote. The next three most popular parties were; the PLRT (with 9 or 16.7%), the LEGA (with 8 or 14.8%) and the SSI (with 7 or 13.0%).

== Economy ==
As of 2007, Moleno had an unemployment rate of 6.25%. As of 2005, there is 1 person employed in the primary economic sector and about 1 business involved in this sector. 2 people are employed in the secondary sector and there is 1 business in this sector. 1 person is employed in the tertiary sector, with 1 business in this sector.

There were 41 residents of the municipality who were employed in some capacity, of which females made up 34.1% of the workforce. In 2000, there were 5 workers who commuted into the municipality and 29 workers who commuted away. The municipality is a net exporter of workers, with about 5.8 workers leaving the municipality for every one entering. Of the working population, 7.3% used public transportation to get to work, and 70.7% used a private car.

== Religion ==
From the 2000 census, 90 or 85.7% were Roman Catholic, while 7 or 6.7% belonged to the Swiss Reformed Church. There are 5 individuals (or about 4.76% of the population) who belong to another church (not listed on the census), and 3 individuals (or about 2.86% of the population) did not answer the question.

== Education ==
In Moleno about 82.7% of the population (between age 25–64) have completed either non-mandatory upper secondary education or additional higher education (either university or a Fachhochschule).

In Moleno there are a total of 17 students (as of 2009). The Ticino education system provides up to three years of non-mandatory kindergarten and in Moleno there are 2 children in kindergarten. The primary school program lasts for five years and includes both a standard school and a special school. In the municipality, 5 students attend the standard primary schools. In the lower secondary school system, students either attend a two-year middle school followed by a two-year pre-apprenticeship or they attend a four-year program to prepare for higher education. There are 5 students in the two-year middle school, 0 in their pre-apprenticeship, and 0 students who are in the four-year advanced program.

The upper secondary school includes several options, but at the end of the upper secondary program, a student will be prepared to enter a trade or to continue on to a university or college. In Ticino, vocational students may either attend school while working on their internship or apprenticeship (which takes three or four years) or may attend school followed by an internship or apprenticeship (which takes one year as a full-time student or one and a half to two years as a part-time student). There are 2 vocational students who are attending school full-time and 3 who attend part-time.

As of 2000, 17 residents attended schools outside the municipality.
