= Giubiasco =

- Former municipality
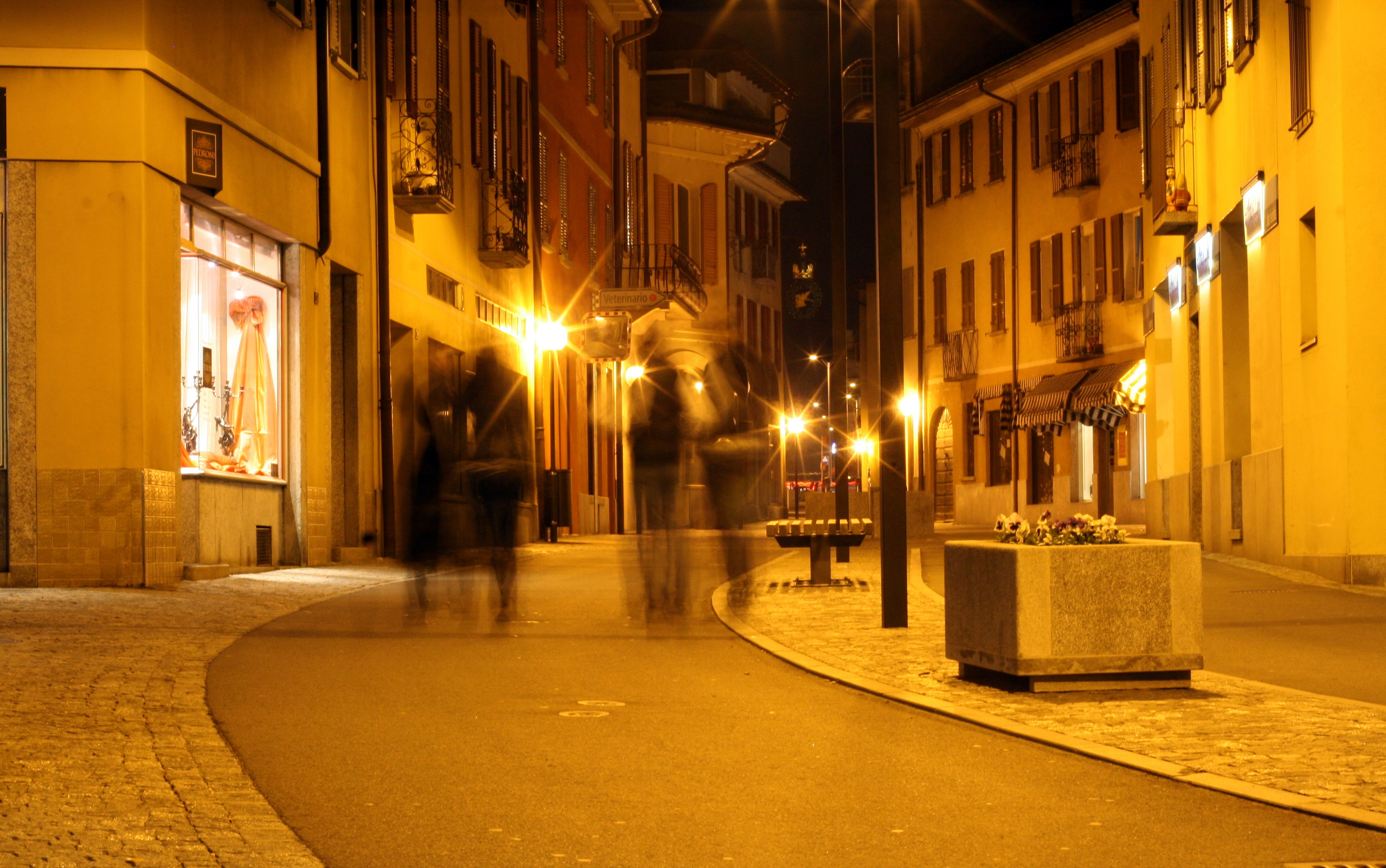

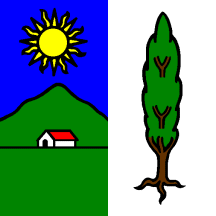
- Flag Coat of arms
- Location of Giubiasco
- Location within Switzerland Location within Canton of Ticino
- Coordinates: 46°10′N 9°1′E
- Country: Switzerland
- Canton: Ticino
- District: Bellinzona

Government
  - Mayor: Sindaco

Area
  - Total: 6.2 km^{2} (2.4 sq mi)
- Elevation: 242 m (794 ft)

Population (December 2007)
  - Total: 8,162
  - Density: 1,300/km^{2} (3,400/sq mi)
- Time zone: UTC+01:00 (CET)
  - Summer (DST): UTC+02:00 (CEST)
- Postal code: 6512
- SFOS number: 5005
- ISO 3166 code: CH-TI
- Surrounded by: Bellinzona, Camorino, Gudo, Monte Carasso, Pianezzo, Sant'Antonino, Sementina
- Twin towns: Prilly (Switzerland)
- Website: www.bellinzona.ch

Giubiasco is a former municipality in the district of Bellinzona in the canton of Ticino in Switzerland.

On 2 April 2017 the former municipalities of Camorino, Claro, Gnosca, Gorduno, Gudo, Moleno, Monte Carasso, Pianezzo, Preonzo, Sant'Antonio and Sementina merged into the municipality of Bellinzona.

== History ==
Due to its location at the center of numerous routes through the Alps, Giubiasco has been important since ancient times. The roads over the Monte Ceneri to the south, the Passo di San Jorio from the east, over the San Bernardino Pass and the Gotthard Pass from the north and the route along Lake Maggiore from the west all meet at Giubiasco.

=== Prehistoric necropolis ===
The discovery of the great cemetery of Giubiasco in 1900, led to uncontrolled treasure hunting and the loss of many objects. It was not until 1905 that the Swiss National Museum organized an excavation, which made it possible to save a certain number of graves and document the discoveries scientifically. Further, limited archaeological digs were organized in 1958 and 1971 to explore the edges of the graveyard. A large part of the collection is kept in the National Museum in Zürich, while other items have been given to various foreign and Swiss museums. For example, the British Museum has an impressive collection of about 300 Iron Age artefacts from the site, which mostly include La Tène, copper alloy jewellery and pottery vessels. They were originally excavated from various graves in Giubiasco and were later donated to the BM by John Brunner and the Swiss National Museum. The latest discoveries are in the Conservation Office in Bellinzona.

The large necropolis, which was not far from the modern train station, has 565 graves. It is one of the rare examples of a site that was in continuous use for a particularly long period, stretching from the late Bronze Age (11th century BC) to the Roman period (2nd century AD). However, only the massive graveyard has been discovered, to date no associated settlement has been located. The cemetery has several different types of graves. The few Late Bronze Age graves are all cremation urn burials. The ashes of the deceased were buried in clay urns in simple trenches in the bare earth, the offerings are modest and consist almost exclusively of fragmented traditional ceramics.

In the early Iron Age the Sopraceneri peoples burials gradually transformed from cremation to a full body burial. The graves were rectangular, bounded by dry stone trenches. From the mid-6th century the distribution of grave goods reflect the Golasecca culture. They include a richer collection of items such as pottery (usually an urn, a bowl and a cup included) but only rarely any bronze containers. There were also clothing, accessories and jewelry; such as bronze or iron brooches, pendants, earrings, rings, belts, sheets and amber necklaces.

Most of the tombs in the necropolis date back to the Late Iron Age (4th–1st century BC) and are exclusively full body burials. From the beginning of the 3rd century the influence of migration is visible in the graves. Celtic belt fittings, pendants and bronze bracelets are found in graves overlying ones from the Golasecca culture. Particularly interesting is the presence of weapons (spears and swords) and helmets of the early Iron Age, a period that is missing in other cemeteries (e.g. Solduno, which is now part of Locarno).

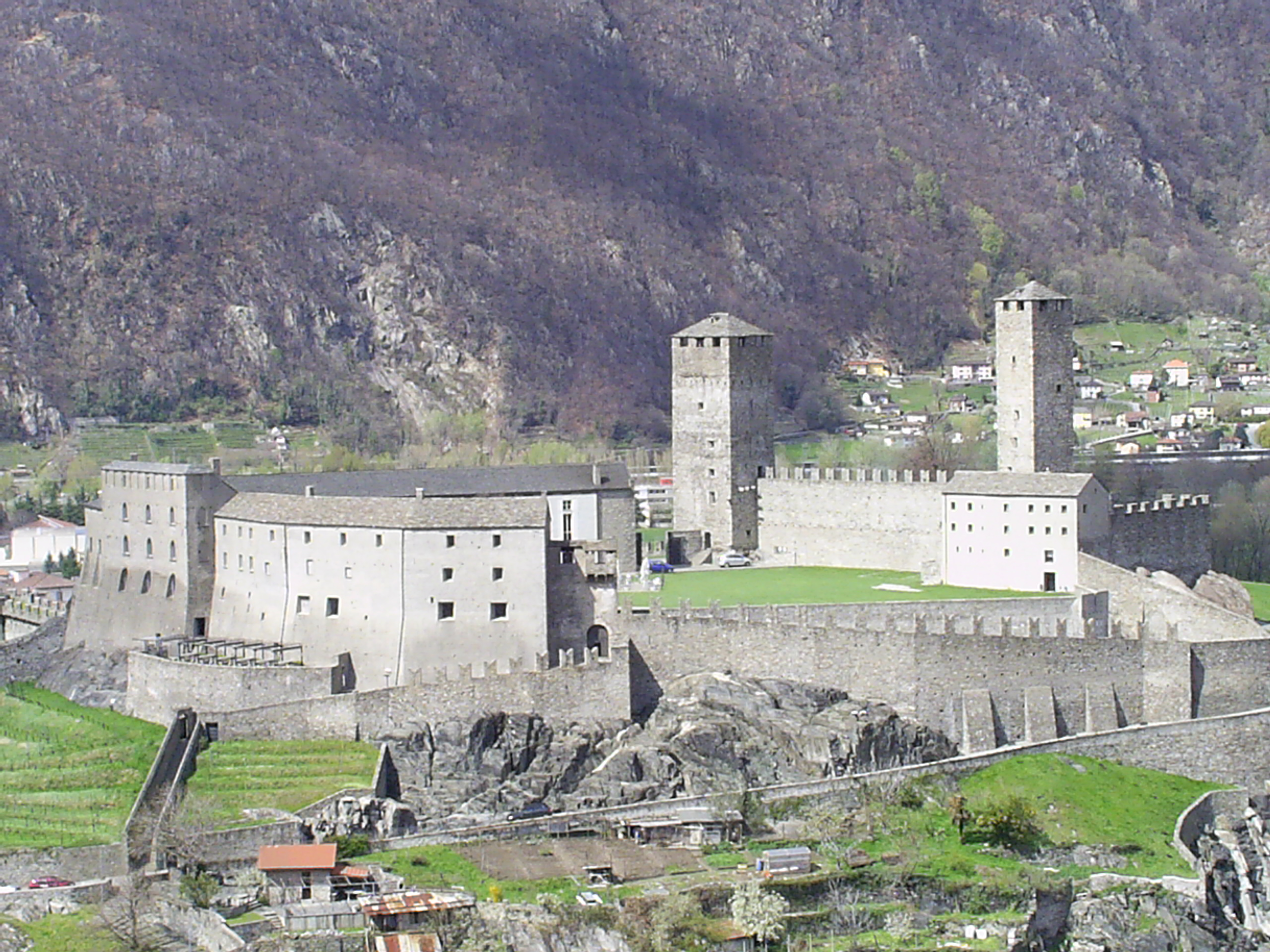
Medieval fortifications above the Roman fortress at Castel Grande

Even with the transition to Roman rule Giubiasco continued to play an important role, probably in connection with the military post of Castel Grande at Bellinzona. Roman items include imported bronze vessels and a silver bowl with two handles in a Roman style. Roman era graves included vessels of clay, metal or glass containing typical Roman grave goods. Additionally, coins and small iron day to day use items have been discovered.

While the archeological discoveries at the necropolis end during the 2nd century, it is likely that the graveyard remained in use for additional centuries. The nearby fortress of Castel Grande remained in use throughout the Roman era.

=== Medieval Giubiasco ===
During the Early Middle Ages, Giubiasco was probably the center of the land that the Abbey of San Pietro in Ciel d'Oro in Pavia, held in Locarno and the upper reaches of Ticino. Presumably, the church of St. Mary of Primasca, which is mentioned in a document of King Hugo of Italy from the 929 as the property of the monastery, was in the village. The village of Giubiasco is first mentioned in 1186 as apud Cibiascum. In 1195 it was mentioned as Zibiassco. By 1200, the abbey had sold their ownership of the village and surrounding area to the noble Adam of Contone. At this time, the communities (vicinanze) of the valleys were able to partly buy limited self-rule with cash payments. In 1186, Frederick Barbarossa granted imperial immediacy to the region around Locarno.

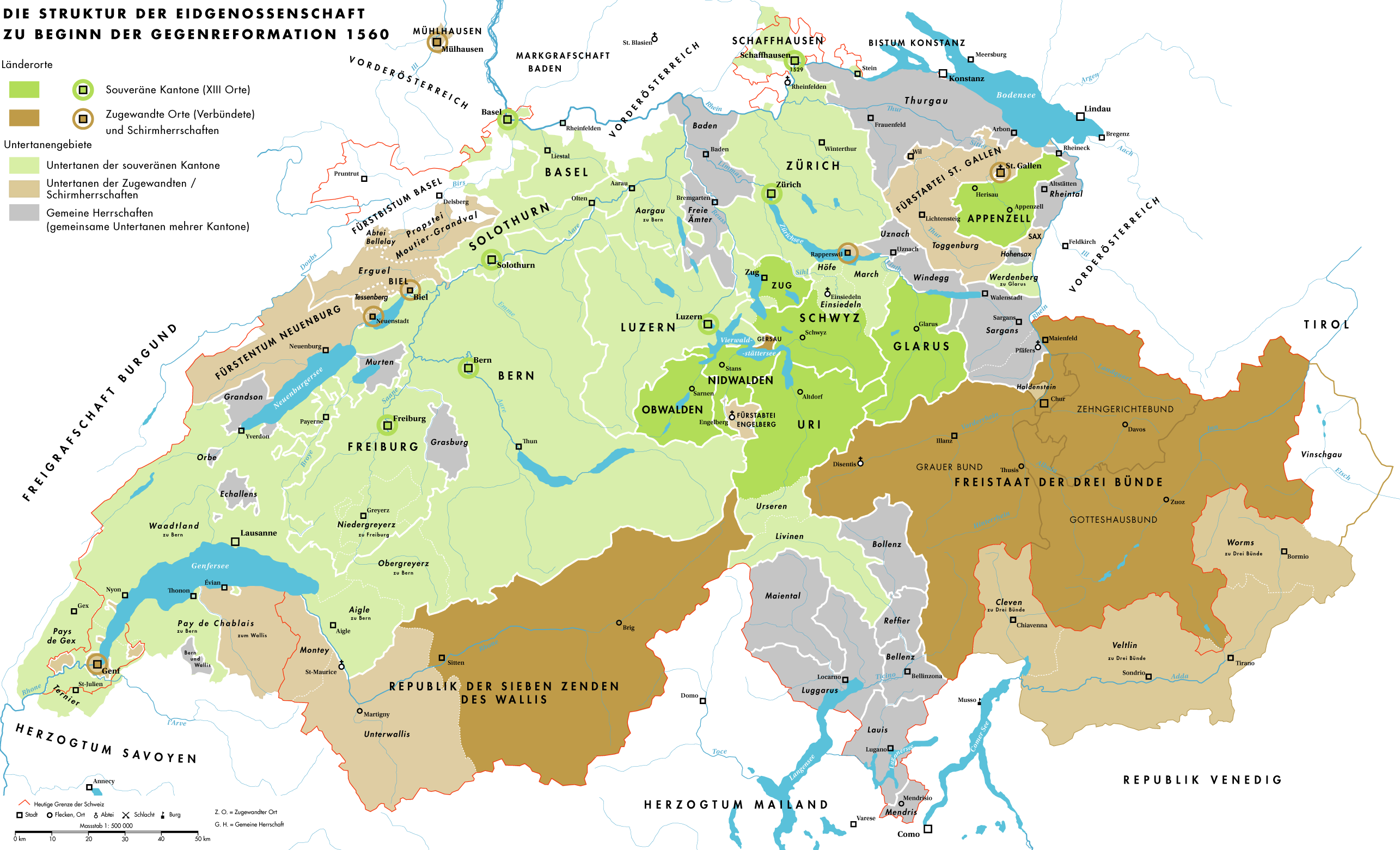
Swiss Confederation in 1560. Grey areas are "associated territories" which were administered by one or more of the full members of the Confederation

After the battle of Arbedo in 1422, it fell under the power of Milan. From Milan, it was ruled by the Visconti and then by the Sforza families. Finally, after the Italian campaigns of the Swiss Confederation at the beginning of the 16th century, it became part of the Bailiwick of Bellinzona, which was administratively shared between Uri, Schwyz, and Nidwalden.

The Church of Santa Maria Assunta if first mentioned in 1387, but is probably from the 13th century. In 1622 it was separated from Bellinzona and became a vice-parish church. It was raised in 1804 to become the parish church. Between the 15th and 17th centuries, the church was enlarged and modified several times.

=== Early Modern Giubiasco ===
Originally, Giubiasco and the rest of the Valle Morobbia formed a single vicinanze, which split in the first half of the 16th century. In 1831 divided the municipality of Morobbia Valle split into Valle Morobbia in Piano, Pianezzo and S. Antonio. Then, in 1867 Valle Morobbia in Piano merged into Giubiasco to form a single community.

The economy of the municipality was based around raising crops and livestock, trading and some industry (grist mills and hammer mills). Some of the residents found jobs in other countries, particularly in Spain. Due to its location, Italian and German-Swiss livestock dealers, held livestock markets in Giubiasco starting in the first decades of the 16th century. The municipality's privileges to hold the fair in the fall led to a protracted dispute with Lugano, which broke out in 1513 and was not settled until the end of the 19th century.

=== Modern Giubiasco ===
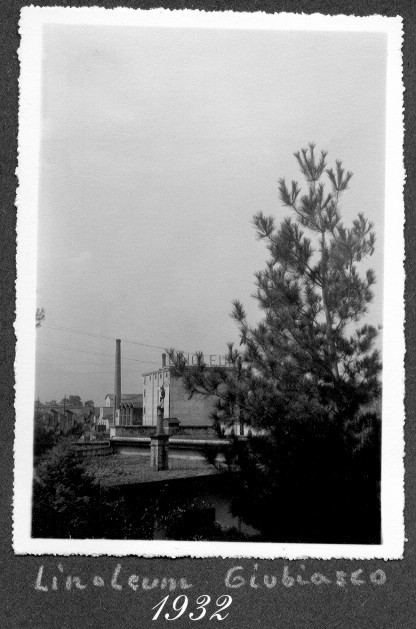
Linoleum factory in Giubiasco

On 25 August 1814, the leaders of the liberal revolutionary people's movement in the Ticino met in Giubiasco, to resist the oligarchic cantonal constitution of 29 July. The so-called Revolt of Giubiasco, set up a temporary government but was soon crushed by Federal troops. The leaders were given heavy sentences. In 1853 the Camorino-Giubiasco-Sementina line was fortified, while the fortifications around Giubiasco were later dismantled, the Fortini della fame at Camorino is still visible. The 19th and 20th century brought profound changes to the economy and society of the municipality. Due to its geographic location near Bellinzona, it became a station on the Gotthard railway. The connection to Locarno was completed in 1874, followed in 1882 by the Lugano and Luino route.

In 1905–06 two factories grew up next to the railway line; the linoleum works (later Forbo factory) and the Lenz engineering works (later Fischer e del San Gottardo Acciaierie Elettriche, closed 1925). In 1932, the Cattaneo AG ironworks opened. The ironworks still have a role in the regional economy.

Agriculture has remained virtually unchanged, cereals, fruit and vegetable are grown of the plains and vineyards are on the hillside. A wine cooperative opened in 1928 and a market hall in 1937. Warehouses, mills and silos for an agricultural cooperative (Società cooperativa agricola ticinese, founded in 1941) supported other municipalities of the region.

The strong population growth in the 1970s and 80s, a consequence of the emergence of medium-sized industrial and small commercial businesses south of the main settlement, has slowed recently. The built-up area for housing and for commercial properties have extended from the old population centers at the foot of the mountain down into the valley floor. In 2000, about two-thirds of jobs were in the services sector, and about a fifth were in the manufacturing sector.

== Geography ==
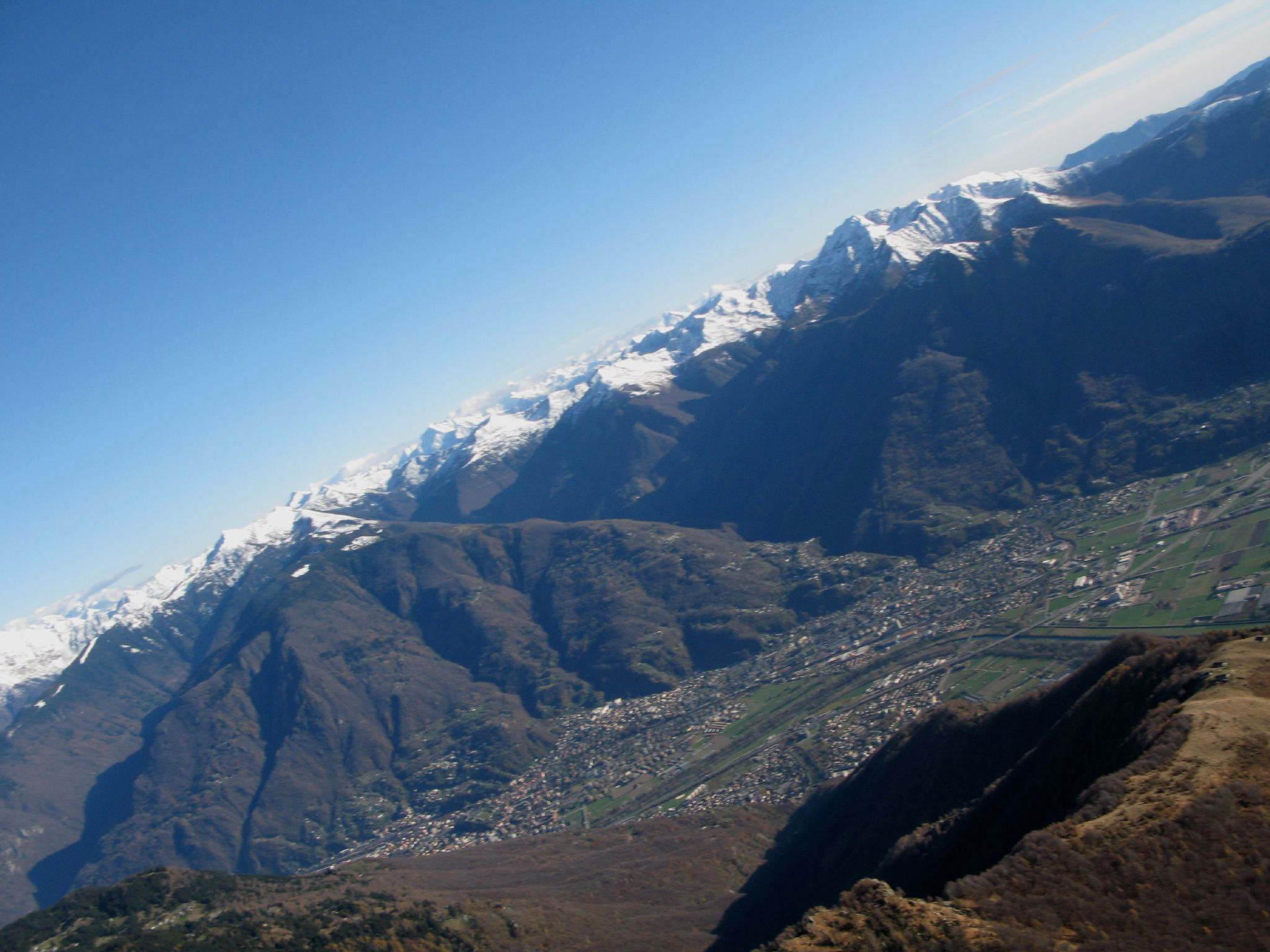
Giubiasco from the air

Aerial view (1954)

Giubiasco has an area, as of 1997, of 6.23 square kilometers (2.41 sq mi). Of this area, 3.79 km^{2} (1.46 sq mi) or 60.8% is used for agricultural purposes, while 1.32 km^{2} (0.51 sq mi) or 21.2% is forested. Of the rest of the land, 2.23 km^{2} (0.86 sq mi) or 35.8% is settled (buildings or roads), 0.09 km^{2} (22 acres) or 1.4% is either rivers or lakes and 0.01 km^{2} (2.5 acres) or 0.2% is unproductive land.

Of the built up area, industrial buildings made up 5.8% of the total area while housing and buildings made up 19.4% and transportation infrastructure made up 6.7%. Power and water infrastructure as well as other special developed areas made up 2.1% of the area while parks, green belts and sports fields made up 1.8%. Out of the forested land, 18.6% of the total land area is heavily forested and 2.6% is covered with orchards or small clusters of trees. Of the agricultural land, 36.0% is used for growing crops, while 5.5% is used for orchards or vine crops and 19.4% is used for alpine pastures. All the water in the municipality is flowing water.

The municipality is located in the Bellinzona district, north of Bellinzona at the mouth of Valle Morobbia. It is part of the Agglomeration of Bellinzona. It consists of the villages of Giubiasco and Piano and the settlements of Lôro, Motti, Palasio, Pedevilla and Sasso Piatto. The municipality of Pianezzo is considering a merger some time in the future into Giubiasco.

== Coat of arms ==
The blazon of the municipal coat of arms is Per pale Azure on a Base Vert beneath a Mountain of the same a house Argent roofed Gules and in Chief a Sun Or and Argent a Poplar eradicated proper.

== Demographics ==
After Lugano, Bellinzona and Locarno, Giubiasco has one of the largest populations in Ticino.

Giubiasco has a population (as of December 2020) of 8,751. As of 2008, 27.3% of the population are foreign nationals. Over the last 10 years (1997–2007) the population has changed at a rate of 8.9%. Most of the population (as of 2000) speaks Italian(87.8%), with German being second most common ( 4.1%) and Serbo-Croatian being third ( 1.8%).

Of the Swiss national languages (as of 2000), 302 speak German 72 people speak French, 6,516 people speak Italian, and 8 people speak Romansh. The remainder (520 people) speak another language.

As of 2008, the gender distribution of the population was 47.7% male and 52.3% female. The population was made up of 2,816 Swiss men (34.0% of the population), and 1,134 (13.7%) non-Swiss men. There were 3,270 Swiss women (39.5%), and 1,065 (12.9%) non-Swiss women.

In 2008 there were 60 live births to Swiss citizens and 19 births to non-Swiss citizens, and in same time span there were 69 deaths of Swiss citizens and 15 non-Swiss citizen deaths. Ignoring immigration and emigration, the population of Swiss citizens decreased by 9 while the foreign population increased by 4. There were 7 Swiss men who emigrated from Switzerland to another country, 9 Swiss women who emigrated from Switzerland to another country, 26 non-Swiss men who emigrated from Switzerland to another country and 15 non-Swiss women who emigrated from Switzerland to another country. The total Swiss population change in 2008 (from all sources) was an increase of 52 and the non-Swiss population change was an increase of 48 people. This represents a population growth rate of 1.2%.

The age distribution, as of 2009, in Giubiasco is; 766 children or 9.2% of the population are between 0 and 9 years old and 888 teenagers or 10.7% are between 10 and 19. Of the adult population, 934 people or 11.3% of the population are between 20 and 29 years old. 1,187 people or 14.3% are between 30 and 39, 1,436 people or 17.3% are between 40 and 49, and 1,008 people or 12.2% are between 50 and 59. The senior population distribution is 921 people or 11.1% of the population are between 60 and 69 years old, 684 people or 8.3% are between 70 and 79, there are 461 people or 5.6% who are over 80.

As of 2000, there were 3,273 private households in the municipality, and an average of 2.2 persons per household. In 2000 there were 906 single family homes (or 59.1% of the total) out of a total of 1,534 inhabited buildings. There were 253 two family buildings (16.5%) and 251 multi-family buildings (16.4%). There were also 124 buildings in the municipality that were multipurpose buildings (used for both housing and commercial or another purpose).

The vacancy rate for the municipality, in 2008, was 1.56%. In 2000 there were 3,628 apartments in the municipality. The most common apartment size was the 4 room apartment of which there were 1,222. There were 154 single room apartments and 623 apartments with five or more rooms. Of these apartments, a total of 3,264 apartments (90.0% of the total) were permanently occupied, while 277 apartments (7.6%) were seasonally occupied and 87 apartments (2.4%) were empty. As of 2007, the construction rate of new housing units was 10.4 new units per 1000 residents.

The historical population is given in the following table:

year	population
1591	ca. 1,000
1698	944
1801	950
1850	1,417
1900	1,722
1930	2,607
1950	3,311
1970	5,796
1990	6,897
1990	6,982
2000	7,418

== Politics ==
In the 2007 federal election the most popular party was the FDP which received 32.36% of the vote. The next three most popular parties were the SP (22.06%), the CVP (18.55%) and the Ticino League (12.52%). In the federal election, a total of 2,162 votes were cast, and the voter turnout was 45.3%.

In the 2007 Gran Consiglio election, there were a total of 4,653 registered voters in Giubiasco, of which 3,131 or 67.3% voted. 50 blank ballots and 3 null ballots were cast, leaving 3,078 valid ballots in the election. The most popular party was the PLRT which received 885 or 28.8% of the vote. The next three most popular parties were; the SSI (with 577 or 18.7%), the PS (with 550 or 17.9%) and the PPD+GenGiova (with 451 or 14.7%).

In the 2007 Consiglio di Stato election, there were 34 blank ballots and 9 null ballots, which left 3,089 valid ballots in the election. The most popular party was the PLRT which received 805 or 26.1% of the vote. The next three most popular parties were; the PS (with 622 or 20.1%), the SSI (with 534 or 17.3%) and the PPD (with 492 or 15.9%).

== Economy ==
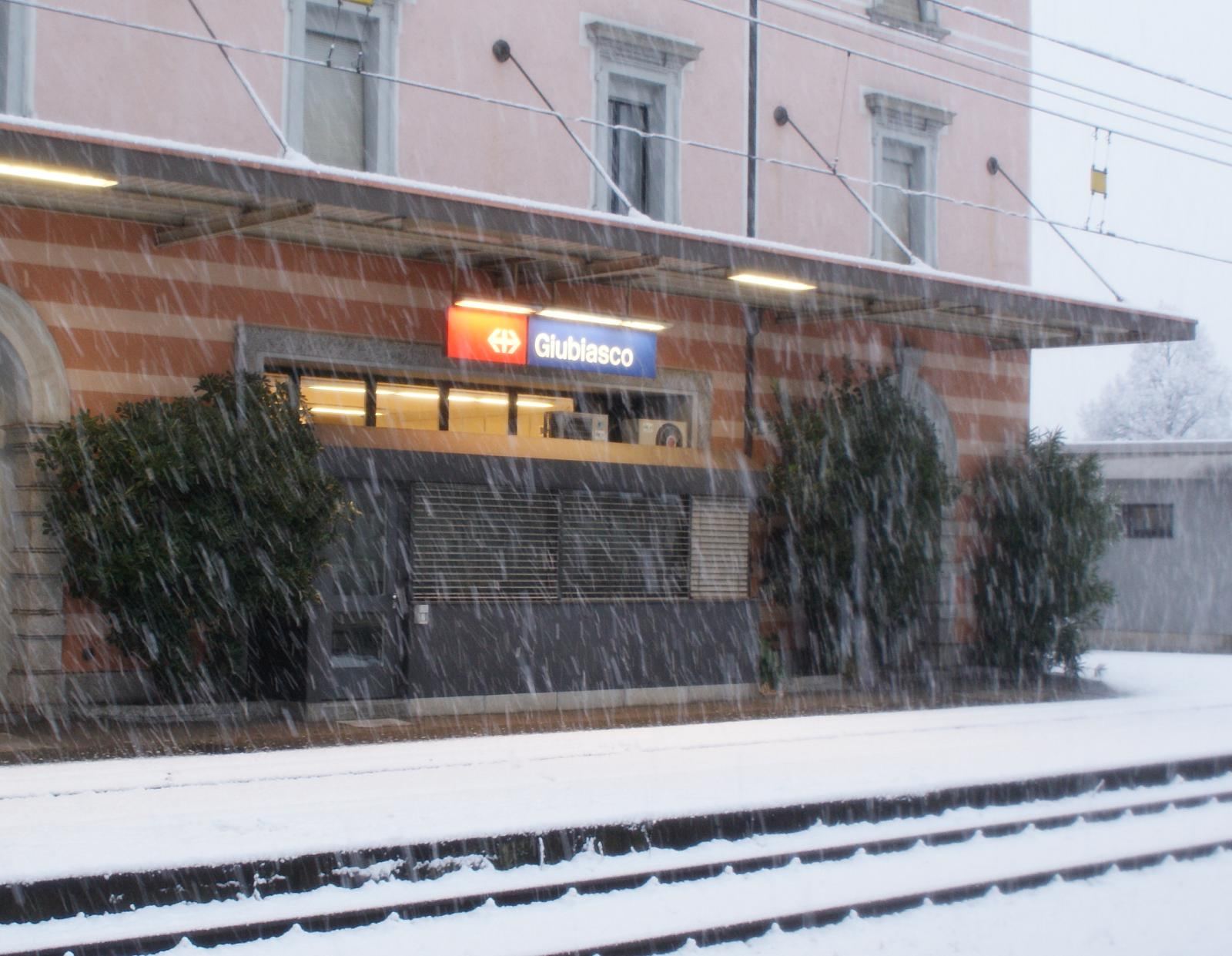
Train station at Giubiasco

As of 2007, Giubiasco had an unemployment rate of 5.23%. As of 2005, there were 78 people employed in the primary economic sector and about 20 businesses involved in this sector. 724 people are employed in the secondary sector and there are 75 businesses in this sector. 1,628 people are employed in the tertiary sector, with 277 businesses in this sector.

There were 3,338 residents of the municipality who were employed in some capacity, of which females made up 42.0% of the workforce. In 2000, there were 1,941 workers who commuted into the municipality and 2,297 workers who commuted away. The municipality is a net exporter of workers, with about 1.2 workers leaving the municipality for every one entering. About 6.0% of the workforce coming into Giubiasco are coming from outside Switzerland, while 0.1% of the locals commute out of Switzerland for work. Of the working population, 10.5% used public transportation to get to work, and 58.9% used a private car.

As of 2009, there were 3 hotels in Giubiasco with a total of 26 rooms and 58 beds.

== Religion ==
From the 2000 census, 5,765 or 77.7% were Roman Catholic, while 323 or 4.4% belonged to the Swiss Reformed Church. There are 991 individuals (or about 13.36% of the population) who belong to another church (not listed on the census), and 339 individuals (or about 4.57% of the population) did not answer the question.

== Education ==
In Giubiasco about 63% of the population (between age 25–64) have completed either non-mandatory upper secondary education or additional higher education (either university or a Fachhochschule).

In Giubiasco there are a total of 1,404 students (as of 2009). The Ticino education system provides up to three years of non-mandatory kindergarten and in Giubiasco there are 209 children in kindergarten. The primary school program lasts for five years and includes both a standard school and a special school. In the municipality, 409 students attend the standard primary schools and 34 students attend the special school. In the lower secondary school system, students either attend a two-year middle school followed by a two-year pre-apprenticeship or they attend a four-year program to prepare for higher education. There are 347 students in the two-year middle school and 5 in their pre-apprenticeship, while 126 students are in the four-year advanced program.

The upper secondary school includes several options, but at the end of the upper secondary program, a student should be prepared to enter a trade or to continue to a university or college. In Ticino, vocational students may either attend school while working on their internship or apprenticeship (which takes three or four years) or may attend school followed by an internship or apprenticeship (which takes one year as a full-time student or one and a half to two years as a part-time student).

There are 84 vocational students who are attending school full-time and 169 who attend part-time. The professional program lasts three years and prepares a student for a job in engineering, nursing, computer science, business, tourism and similar fields. There are 21 students in the professional program.

As of 2000, there were 476 students in Giubiasco who came from another municipality, while 343 residents attended schools outside the municipality.

== Transport ==
Giubiasco is served by the Giubiasco station, situated within the municipality. The station is on the Gotthard railway.
