= Gnosca =

- Former municipality
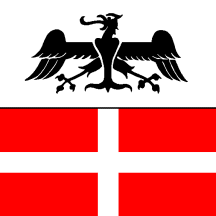
- Flag Coat of arms
- Location of Gnosca
- Location within Switzerland Location within Canton of Ticino
- Coordinates: 46°14′N 9°01′E
- Country: Switzerland
- Canton: Ticino
- District: Bellinzona

Government
  - Mayor: Sindaco

Area
  - Total: 7.5 km^{2} (2.9 sq mi)
- Elevation: 277 m (909 ft)

Population (December 2004)
  - Total: 524
  - Density: 70/km^{2} (180/sq mi)
- Time zone: UTC+01:00 (CET)
  - Summer (DST): UTC+02:00 (CEST)
- Postal code: 6525
- SFOS number: 5006
- ISO 3166 code: CH-TI
- Surrounded by: Arbedo-Castione, Claro, Gorduno, Preonzo
- Website: www.bellinzona.ch

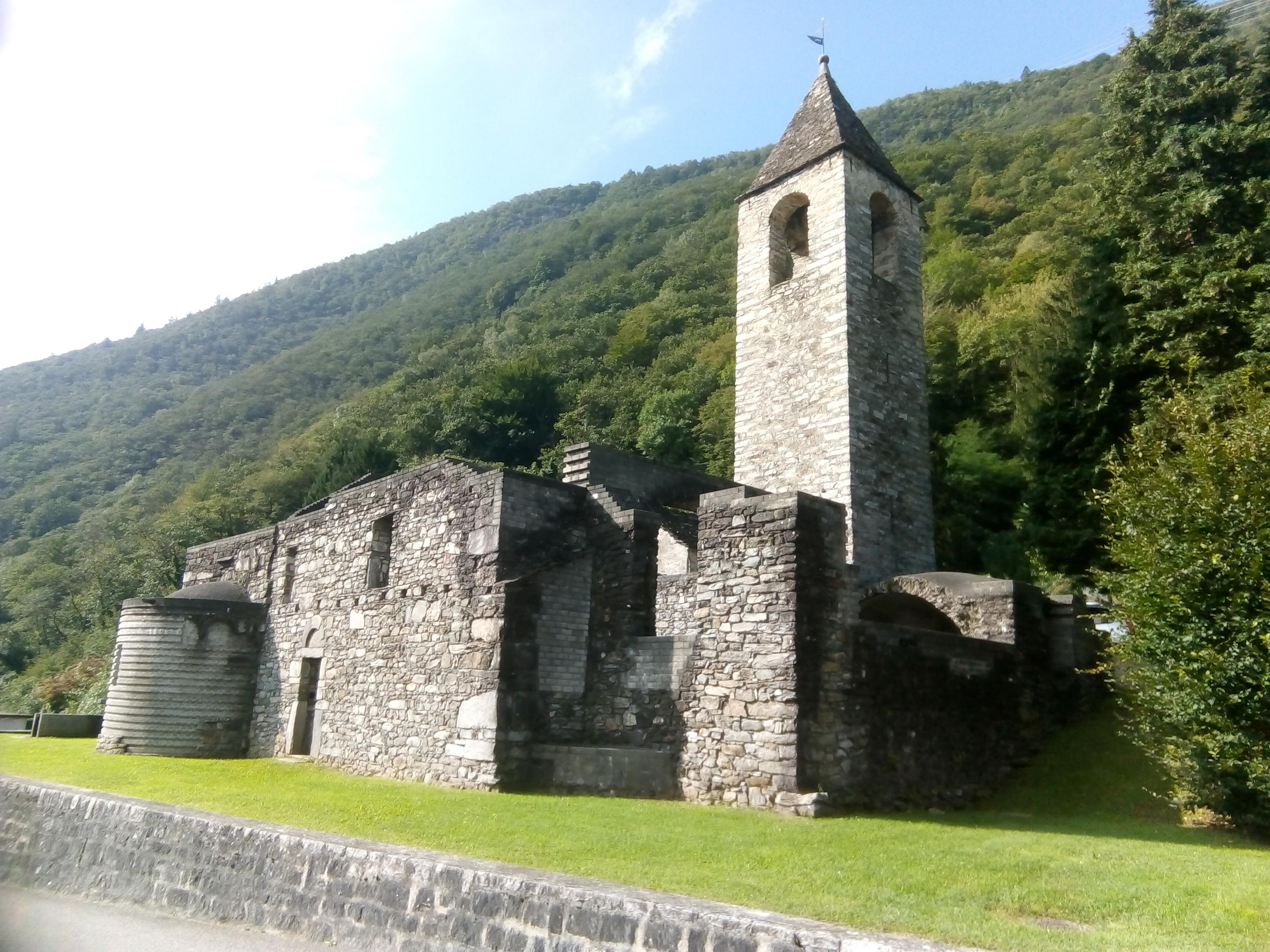
St. John Church, Gnosca

Gnosca is a former municipality in the district of Bellinzona in the canton of Ticino in Switzerland.

On 2 April 2017 the former municipalities of Camorino, Claro, Giubiasco, Gorduno, Gudo, Moleno, Monte Carasso, Pianezzo, Preonzo, Sant'Antonio and Sementina merged into the municipality of Bellinzona.

== History ==
Gnosca is first mentioned in 1198 as Niosca in the records of Como and the cathedral of Milan. While it is likely that there were earlier settlements, nothing is known about them. An arbitration document of 1202 granted the S. Giovanni church and the church of SS Maurizio e Carpoforo in Gnosca Castle to Como. The parish church of St. Peter Martyr is on a list of churches in the diocese of Milan in the 13th century. In 1335 Gnosca is mentioned as a village in the county of Bellinzona, although part of the population was assumed for some time by the cathedral of Milan. This led to a situation where the church was used for both the Ambrosian and Roman Rites at the same time. The village is now on the edge of the agglomeration of Bellinzona. With the construction of many new homes it has lost, in recent decades, its rural character.

== Geography ==
Aerial view (1953)

Gnosca has an area, as of 1997, of 7.45 square kilometers (2.88 sq mi). Of this area, 0.89 km^{2} (0.34 sq mi) or 11.9% is used for agricultural purposes, while 5.76 km^{2} (2.22 sq mi) or 77.3% is forested. Of the rest of the land, 0.42 km^{2} (0.16 sq mi) or 5.6% is settled (buildings or roads), 0.14 km^{2} (35 acres) or 1.9% is either rivers or lakes and 0.23 km^{2} (0.089 sq mi) or 3.1% is unproductive land.

Of the built up area, housing and buildings made up 2.0% and transportation infrastructure made up 3.1%. Out of the forested land, 72.3% of the total land area is heavily forested and 2.8% is covered with orchards or small clusters of trees. Of the agricultural land, 8.6% is used for growing crops, while 1.3% is used for orchards or vine crops and 2.0% is used for alpine pastures. All the water in the municipality is flowing water. Of the unproductive areas, 2.4% is unproductive vegetation.

The municipality is located in the Bellinzona district, on the right bank of the Ticino river at the entrance to the Riviera.

== Coat of arms ==
The blazon of the municipal coat of arms is Per fess Argent an Eagle displayed Sable and Gules a Cross Argent.

== Demographics ==
Gnosca has a population (as of December 2020) of 752. As of 2008, 12.9% of the population are foreign nationals. Over the last 10 years (1997–2007) the population has changed at a rate of 33.5%. Most of the population (as of 2000) speaks Italian(94.4%), with German being second most common ( 1.8%) and French being third ( 1.4%).

Of the Swiss national languages (as of 2000), 9 speak German, 7 people speak French, 485 people speak Italian. The remainder (13 people) speak another language.

As of 2008, the gender distribution of the population was 49.7% male and 50.3% female. The population was made up of 273 Swiss men (40.7% of the population), and 60 (9.0%) non-Swiss men. There were 306 Swiss women (45.7%), and 31 (4.6%) non-Swiss women. In 2008 there was 1 live birth to Swiss citizens, and in same time span there were 7 deaths of Swiss citizens. Ignoring immigration and emigration, the population of Swiss citizens decreased by 6 while the foreign population remained the same. There was 1 Swiss man and 1 non-Swiss man who emigrated from Switzerland to another country and 3 non-Swiss women who emigrated from Switzerland to another country. The total Swiss population change in 2008 (from all sources) was an increase of 4 and the non-Swiss population change was an increase of 7 people. This represents a population growth rate of 1.7%.

The age distribution, as of 2009, in Gnosca is; 93 children or 13.9% of the population are between 0 and 9 years old and 66 teenagers or 9.9% are between 10 and 19. Of the adult population, 39 people or 5.8% of the population are between 20 and 29 years old. 113 people or 16.9% are between 30 and 39, 126 people or 18.8% are between 40 and 49, and 80 people or 11.9% are between 50 and 59. The senior population distribution is 83 people or 12.4% of the population are between 60 and 69 years old, 42 people or 6.3% are between 70 and 79, there are 28 people or 4.2% who are over 80.

As of 2000, there were 202 private households in the municipality, and an average of 2.5 persons per household. In 2000 there were 177 single family homes (or 82.7% of the total) out of a total of 214 inhabited buildings. There were 29 two family buildings (13.6%) and 3 multi-family buildings (1.4%). There were also 5 buildings in the municipality that were multipurpose buildings (used for both housing and commercial or another purpose). co The vacancy rate for the municipality, in 2008, was 0.34%. In 2000 there were 249 apartments in the municipality. The most common apartment size was the 4 room apartment of which there were 100. There were 8 single room apartments and 76 apartments with five or more rooms. Of these apartments, a total of 200 apartments (80.3% of the total) were permanently occupied, while 47 apartments (18.9%) were seasonally occupied and 2 apartments (.8%) were empty. As of 2007, the construction rate of new housing units was 6.2 new units per 1000 residents.

The historical population is given in the following table:

| year | population |
|---|---|
| 1602 | 240 |
| 1801 | 258 |
| 1850 | 195 |
| 1900 | 216 |
| 1950 | 280 |
| 2000 | 514 |

In the 2007 federal election the most popular party was the CVP which received 38.93% of the vote. The next three most popular parties were the FDP (24.04%), the SP (18.59%) and the Ticino League (10.78%). In the federal election, a total of 244 votes were cast, and the voter turnout was 56.0%.

In the 2007 Gran Consiglio election, there were a total of 433 registered voters in Gnosca, of which 348 or 80.4% voted. 3 blank ballots and null ballots were cast, leaving 345 valid ballots in the election. The most popular party was the PPD+GenGiova which received 102 or 29.6% of the vote. The next three most popular parties were; the SSI (with 73 or 21.2%), the PLRT (with 69 or 20.0%) and the PS (with 56 or 16.2%).

In the 2007 Consiglio di Stato election, there were 3 blank ballots and 1 null ballots, which left 344 valid ballots in the election. The most popular party was the PPD which received 103 or 29.9% of the vote. The next three most popular parties were; the PS (with 66 or 19.2%), the PLRT (with 62 or 18.0%) and the SSI (with 60 or 17.4%).

== Economy ==
As of 2007, Gnosca had an unemployment rate of 2.28%. As of 2005, there were 11 people employed in the primary economic sector and about 5 businesses involved in this sector. 7 people are employed in the secondary sector and there are 3 businesses in this sector. 32 people are employed in the tertiary sector, with 11 businesses in this sector.

There were 234 residents of the municipality who were employed in some capacity, of which females made up 35.9% of the workforce. In 2000, there were 17 workers who commuted into the municipality and 178 workers who commuted away. The municipality is a net exporter of workers, with about 10.5 workers leaving the municipality for every one entering. Of the working population, 4.7% used public transportation to get to work, and 66.7% used a private car. As of 2009, there were 0 hotels in Gnosca.

From the 2000 census, 447 or 87.0% were Roman Catholic, while 20 or 3.9% belonged to the Swiss Reformed Church. There are 29 individuals (or about 5.64% of the population) who belong to another church (not listed on the census), and 18 individuals (or about 3.50% of the population) did not answer the question.

== Education ==
The entire Swiss population is generally well educated. In Gnosca about 75.1% of the population (between age 25 and 64) have completed either non-mandatory upper secondary education or additional higher education (either university or a Fachhochschule).

In Gnosca there are a total of 133 students (as of 2009). The Ticino education system provides up to three years of non-mandatory kindergarten and in Gnosca there are 30 children in kindergarten. The primary school program lasts for five years and includes both a standard school and a special school. In the municipality, 50 students attend the standard primary schools and 1 students attend the special school. In the lower secondary school system, students either attend a two-year middle school followed by a two-year pre-apprenticeship or they attend a four-year program to prepare for higher education. There are 26 students in the two-year middle school and in their pre-apprenticeship, while 12 students are in the four-year advanced program.

The upper secondary school includes several options, but at the end of the upper secondary program, a student will be prepared to enter a trade or to continue on to a university or college. In Ticino, vocational students may either attend school while working on their internship or apprenticeship (which takes three or four years) or may attend school followed by an internship or apprenticeship (which takes one year as a full-time student or one and a half to two years as a part-time student). There are 4 vocational students who are attending school full-time and 8 who attend part-time. The professional program lasts three years and prepares a student for a job in engineering, nursing, computer science, business, tourism and similar fields. There are 2 students in the professional program.

As of 2000, there were 2 students in Gnosca who came from another municipality, while 52 residents attended schools outside the municipality.
