= Pianezzo =

- Former municipality
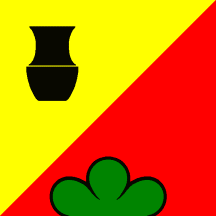
- Flag Coat of arms
- Location of Pianezzo
- Location within Switzerland Location within Canton of Ticino
- Coordinates: 46°10′N 9°02′E
- Country: Switzerland
- Canton: Ticino
- District: Bellinzona

Government
  - Mayor: Sindaco

Area
  - Total: 8.02 km^{2} (3.10 sq mi)
- Elevation: 491 m (1,611 ft)

Population (December 2004)
  - Total: 512
  - Density: 63.8/km^{2} (165/sq mi)
- Time zone: UTC+01:00 (CET)
  - Summer (DST): UTC+02:00 (CEST)
- Postal code: 6582
- SFOS number: 5014
- ISO 3166 code: CH-TI
- Surrounded by: Bellinzona, Cadenazzo, Camorino, Giubiasco, Isone, Medeglia, Sant'Antonio
- Website: bellinzona.ch

Pianezzo is a former municipality in the district of Bellinzona in the canton of Ticino in Switzerland.

On 2 April 2017 the former municipalities of Camorino, Claro, Giubiasco, Gnosca, Gorduno, Gudo, Moleno, Monte Carasso, Preonzo, Sant'Antonio and Sementina merged into the municipality of Bellinzona.

== History ==
Aerial view (1953)

In 1905, a major burial ground from the Iron Age came to light, which seems to be from the Golasecca culture. Objects found in the graves indicate that the settlement was also in contact with residents of the Alpine region. East of the city there are also some medieval ruins, which are probably built on the site of a Roman era customs post or even a pre-Roman settlement.

Pianezzo is first mentioned in 1382 as Planezio. In the 15th century the Church of S. Pietro in Bellinzona possessed vineyards and farmsteads in Pianezzo. In the Middle Ages, portions of the village formed part of the community of Vallemorobbia. In 1803 this community became the political municipality of Vallemorobbia. In 1831 it became independent after the old municipality was divided into three new municipalities; Pianezzo, Sant'Antonio and Vallemorobbia in Piano.

The village church was under the Mother Church in Bellinzona until 1600, followed by the Church of SS Giacomo e Filippo. In the 16th century, a new church was built on the ruins of an earlier church. It was renovated in 1960–70 and 2002–03. In 1680 Pianezzo became an independent parish.

Some of the tower houses in the village still show the typical construction of rural houses in the Valle Morobbia.

The local economy was based on traditional agriculture and animal husbandry. Even today the vineyards are operated as a sideline business. There are a number of second or vacation homes in the village. At the beginning of the 21st century more than three-quarters of workers in Pianezzo commuted to Bellinzona and Giubiasco.

== Geography ==
Pianezzo has an area, as of 1997, of 8.02 square kilometers (3.10 sq mi). Of this area, 0.45 km^{2} (0.17 sq mi) or 5.6% is used for agricultural purposes, while 7.19 km^{2} (2.78 sq mi) or 89.7% is forested. Of the rest of the land, 0.32 km^{2} (0.12 sq mi) or 4.0% is settled (buildings or roads), 0.08 km^{2} (20 acres) or 1.0% is either rivers or lakes and 0.17 km^{2} (0.066 sq mi) or 2.1% is unproductive land.

Of the built up area, housing and buildings made up 2.9% and transportation infrastructure made up 1.0%. Out of the forested land, 85.0% of the total land area is heavily forested and 2.0% is covered with orchards or small clusters of trees. Of the agricultural land, 2.0% is used for growing crops and 2.9% is used for alpine pastures. All the water in the municipality is flowing water. Of the unproductive areas, 1.6% is unproductive vegetation.

The municipality is located in the Bellinzona district, at the entrance to the Valle Morobbia. It consists of the village of Pianezzo and the hamlets of Paudo. The municipalities of Giubiasco and Pianezzo are considering a merger some time in the future, where Pianezzo will be absorbed into Giubiasco.

== Coat of arms ==
The blazon of the municipal coat of arms is Per bend sinister Or a Cup Sable and Gules a Mount of 3 Coupeaux Vert. The cup may represent a glass (Italian: bicchiere) dating from the Iron Age. This alludes to the necropolis of Pianezzo dating from that period.

== Demographics ==
Pianezzo has a population (as of December 2020) of 605. As of 2008, 7.6% of the population are foreign nationals. Over the last 10 years (1997–2007) the population has changed at a rate of 23.3%.

Most of the population (as of 2000) speaks Italian(87.9%), with German being second most common ( 8.0%) and French being third ( 2.0%). Of the Swiss national languages (as of 2000), 39 speak German, 10 people speak French, 430 people speak Italian. The remainder (10 people) speak another language.

As of 2008, the gender distribution of the population was 48.1% male and 51.9% female. The population was made up of 245 Swiss men (43.7% of the population), and 25 (4.5%) non-Swiss men. There were 268 Swiss women (47.8%), and 23 (4.1%) non-Swiss women.

In 2008 there were 4 live births to Swiss citizens and births to non-Swiss citizens, and in same time span there were 7 deaths of Swiss citizens and 2 non-Swiss citizen deaths. Ignoring immigration and emigration, the population of Swiss citizens decreased by 3 while the foreign population decreased by 2. There was 1 Swiss woman who emigrated from Switzerland. At the same time, there was 1 non-Swiss woman who emigrated from Switzerland to another country. The total Swiss population change in 2008 (from all sources) was a decrease of 8 and the non-Swiss population change was a decrease of 3 people. This represents a population growth rate of −2.0%.

The age distribution, as of 2009, in Pianezzo is; 55 children or 9.8% of the population are between 0 and 9 years old and 50 teenagers or 8.9% are between 10 and 19. Of the adult population, 46 people or 8.2% of the population are between 20 and 29 years old. 76 people or 13.5% are between 30 and 39, 99 people or 17.6% are between 40 and 49, and 88 people or 15.7% are between 50 and 59. The senior population distribution is 74 people or 13.2% of the population are between 60 and 69 years old, 47 people or 8.4% are between 70 and 79, there are 26 people or 4.6% who are over 80.

As of 2000, there were 220 private households in the municipality, and an average of 2.2 persons per household. In 2000 there were 476 single family homes (or 92.1% of the total) out of a total of 517 inhabited buildings. There were 32 two family buildings (6.2%) and 5 multi-family buildings (1.0%). There were also 4 buildings in the municipality that were multipurpose buildings (used for both housing and commercial or another purpose).

The vacancy rate for the municipality, in 2008, was 0%. In 2000 there were 557 apartments in the municipality. The most common apartment size was the 3-room apartment of which there were 166. There were 42 single room apartments and 115 apartments with five or more rooms. Of these apartments, a total of 220 apartments (39.5% of the total) were permanently occupied, while 335 apartments (60.1%) were seasonally occupied and 2 apartments (0.4%) were empty. As of 2007, the construction rate of new housing units was 0 new units per 1000 residents.

The historical population is given in the following table:

| year | population |
|---|---|
| 1671 | 202 |
| 1769 | 197 |
| 1850 | 328 |
| 1900 | 342 |
| 1950 | 278 |
| 2000 | 489 |

== Politics ==
In the 2007 federal election the most popular party was the FDP which received 37.76% of the vote. The next three most popular parties were the CVP (20.25%), the SP (19.35%) and the Ticino League (9.54%). In the federal election, a total of 234 votes were cast, and the voter turnout was 53.7%.

In the 2007 Gran Consiglio election, there were a total of 438 registered voters in Pianezzo, of which 319 or 72.8% voted. 1 blank ballot was cast, leaving 318 valid ballots in the election. The most popular party was the PLRT which received 108 or 34.0% of the vote. The next three most popular parties were; the PPD+GenGiova (with 65 or 20.4%), the PS (with 53 or 16.7%) and the SSI (with 46 or 14.5%).

In the 2007 Consiglio di Stato election, there were 319 valid ballots in the election. The most popular party was the PLRT which received 104 or 32.6% of the vote. The next three most popular parties were; the PS (with 61 or 19.1%), the PPD (with 57 or 17.9%) and the SSI (with 52 or 16.3%).

== Economy ==
As of 2007, Pianezzo had an unemployment rate of 4.28%. As of 2005, there were 4 people employed in the primary economic sector and about 2 businesses involved in this sector. 8 people are employed in the secondary sector and there are 3 businesses in this sector. 30 people are employed in the tertiary sector, with 14 businesses in this sector. There were 211 residents of the municipality who were employed in some capacity, of which females made up 43.6% of the workforce.

In 2000, there were 17 workers who commuted into the municipality and 172 workers who commuted away. The municipality is a net exporter of workers, with about 10.1 workers leaving the municipality for every one entering. Of the working population, 10.4% used public transportation to get to work, and 68.7% used a private car. As of 2009, there was one hotel in Pianezzo.

== Religion ==
From the 2000 census, 383 or 78.3% were Roman Catholic, while 17 or 3.5% belonged to the Swiss Reformed Church. There are 67 individuals (or about 13.70% of the population) who belong to another church (not listed on the census), and 22 individuals (or about 4.50% of the population) did not answer the question.

== Education ==
In Pianezzo about 74.9% of the population (between age 25–64) have completed either non-mandatory upper secondary education or additional higher education (either university or a Fachhochschule).

In Pianezzo there are a total of 89 students (as of 2009). The Ticino education system provides up to three years of non-mandatory kindergarten and in Pianezzo there are 15 children in kindergarten. The primary school program lasts for five years and includes both a standard school and a special school. In the municipality, 30 students attend the standard primary schools and students attend the special school. In the lower secondary school system, students either attend a two-year middle school followed by a two-year pre-apprenticeship or they attend a four-year program to prepare for higher education. There are 17 students in the two-year middle school and 0 in their pre-apprenticeship, while 13 students are in the four-year advanced program.

The upper secondary school includes several options, but at the end of the upper secondary program, a student will be prepared to enter a trade or to continue on to a university or college. In Ticino, vocational students may either attend school while working on their internship or apprenticeship (which takes three or four years) or may attend school followed by an internship or apprenticeship (which takes one year as a full-time student or one and a half to two years as a part-time student). There are 5 vocational students who are attending school full-time and 7 who attend part-time.

The professional program lasts three years and prepares a student for a job in engineering, nursing, computer science, business, tourism and similar fields. There are 2 students in the professional program.

As of 2000, there were 19 students in Pianezzo who came from another municipality, while 39 residents attended schools outside the municipality.
