= Camorino =

- Former municipality
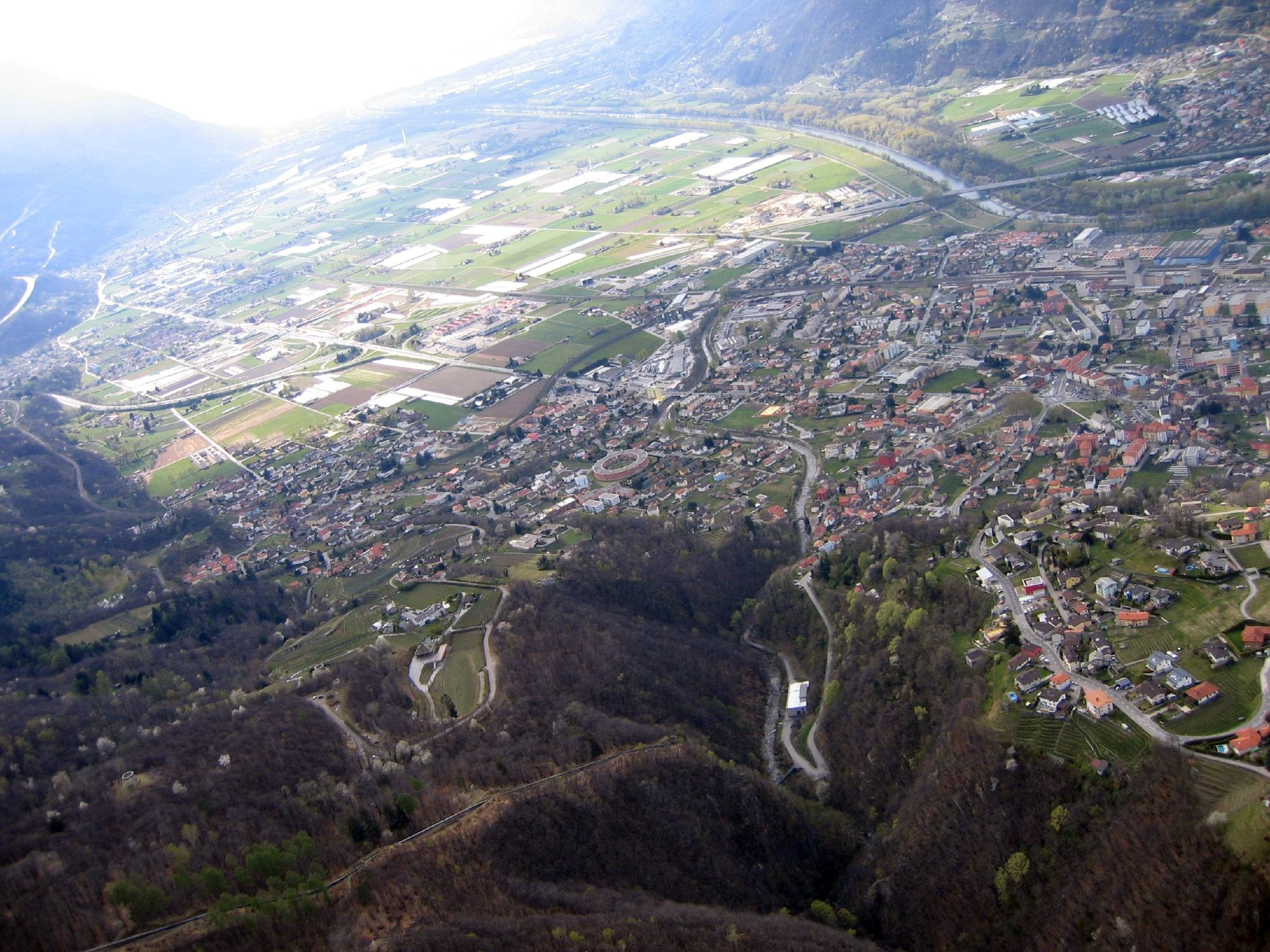
- Camorino

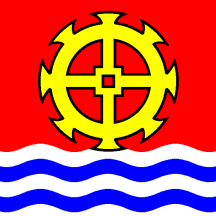
- Flag Coat of arms
- Location of Camorino
- Location within Switzerland Location within Canton of Ticino
- Coordinates: 46°10′N 9°00′E
- Country: Switzerland
- Canton: Ticino
- District: Bellinzona

Government
  - Mayor: Sindaco

Area
  - Total: 8.27 km^{2} (3.19 sq mi)
- Elevation: 223 m (732 ft)

Population (2003)
  - Total: 2,346
  - Density: 284/km^{2} (735/sq mi)
- Time zone: UTC+01:00 (CET)
  - Summer (DST): UTC+02:00 (CEST)
- Postal code: 6528
- SFOS number: 5004
- ISO 3166 code: CH-TI
- Surrounded by: Cadenazzo, Giubiasco, Isone, Medeglia, Pianezzo, Sant'Antonino
- Website: www.bellinzona.ch

Camorino is a former municipality in the district of Bellinzona in the canton of Ticino in Switzerland.

On 2 April 2017 the former municipalities of Claro, Giubiasco, Gnosca, Gorduno, Gudo, Moleno, Monte Carasso, Pianezzo, Preonzo, Sant'Antonio and Sementina merged into the municipality of Bellinzona.

== History ==
From time immemorial the inhabitants of Isone regularly crossed the Tiglio alpine pass to arrive in the Camorino area, where they owned vineyards and arable land. Over the centuries, many of them finally created a village. Camorino is first mentioned in 1237 as part of the lands of the collegiate church of S. Pietro in Bellinzona. A church is mentioned in the village in 1237 and 1285, but no visible traces have been preserved. The existing parish church of San Martino was built in 1553 and completely renovated in 1888. In 1583, the village church split from the Bellinzona parish and was confirmed in 1591 as a separate parish.

In 1853 a defensive line between Sementina and Camorino was built to create jobs for the citizen of Ticino expelled from the Kingdom of Lombardy–Venetia. The Fortini della fame, five round towers with arrow slits in the upper part, is part of these fortifications.

Camorino was originally a pure farming village (raising mostly grapes, strawberries and livestock) with some handicraft, trade and light industry (manufacturing knitwear and pasta as well as a mill). Due to the lack of jobs, some of whose inhabitants emigrated to America. The population growth coincides with the growth of the cities of Giubiasco and Bellinzona. Today it is a residential community with many commuters, with no large industrial companies and with very little agriculture.

Aerial view (1964)

== Geography ==
Camorino has an area, as of 1997, of 8.28 square kilometers (3.20 sq mi). Of this area, 1.93 km^{2} (0.75 sq mi) or 23.3% is used for agricultural purposes, while 5.55 km^{2} (2.14 sq mi) or 67.0% is forested. Of the rest of the land, 1.05 km^{2} (0.41 sq mi) or 12.7% is settled (buildings or roads), 0.05 km^{2} (12 acres) or 0.6% is either rivers or lakes and 0.15 km^{2} (37 acres) or 1.8% is unproductive land.

Of the built up area, housing and buildings made up 6.5% and transportation infrastructure made up 4.3%. Out of the forested land, 63.9% of the total land area is heavily forested and 2.8% is covered with orchards or small clusters of trees. Of the agricultural land, 11.4% is used for growing crops, while 5.4% is used for orchards or vine crops and 6.5% is used for alpine pastures. All the water in the municipality is flowing water. Of the unproductive areas, 1.7% is unproductive vegetation and .

The municipality is located in the Bellinzona district, and is a suburb of Bellinzona. The village is crossed by several major roads and rail lines leading into Bellinzona.

== Coat of arms ==
The blazon of the municipal coat of arms is Gules on a Base Argent wavy two bars wavy Azure and overall a Mill Wheel Or. The mill wheel refers to the Maglio, a mill which, with another house, remained undamaged after a landslide that destroyed the rest of the village."

== Demographics ==
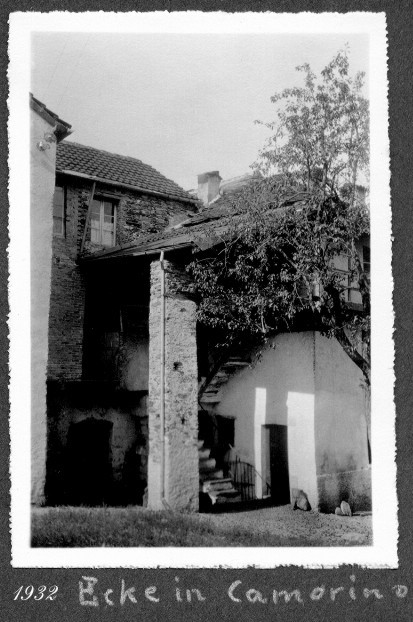
House in Camorino in 1932

Camorino has a population (as of December 2020) of 2,809. As of 2008, 16.1% of the population are foreign nationals. Over the last 10 years (1997–2007) the population has changed at a rate of 17.7%. Most of the population (as of 2000) speaks Italian(89.6%), with German being second most common ( 5.3%) and French being third ( 1.2%).

Of the Swiss national languages (as of 2000), 117 speak German 26 people speak French, 1,981 people speak Italian, and 2 people speak Romansh. The remainder (84 people) speak another language.

As of 2008, the gender distribution of the population was 50.4% male and 49.6% female. The population was made up of 1,088 Swiss men (40.2% of the population), and 275 (10.2%) non-Swiss men. There were 1,139 Swiss women (42.1%), and 204 (7.5%) non-Swiss women.

In 2008 there were 27 live births to Swiss citizens and 1 birth to non-Swiss citizens, and in same time span there were 24 deaths of Swiss citizens and 3 non-Swiss citizen deaths. Ignoring immigration and emigration, the population of Swiss citizens increased by 3 while the foreign population decreased by 2. There was 1 Swiss man and 1 Swiss woman who emigrated from Switzerland to another country, 9 non-Swiss men who emigrated from Switzerland to another country and 5 non-Swiss women who emigrated from Switzerland to another country. The total Swiss population change in 2008 (from all sources) was an increase of 26 and the non-Swiss population change was an increase of 19 people. This represents a population growth rate of 1.8%.

The age distribution, as of 2009, in Camorino is; 303 children or 11.2% of the population are between 0 and 9 years old and 272 teenagers or 10.1% are between 10 and 19. Of the adult population, 316 people or 11.7% of the population are between 20 and 29 years old. 383 people or 14.2% are between 30 and 39, 481 people or 17.8% are between 40 and 49, and 370 people or 13.7% are between 50 and 59. The senior population distribution is 286 people or 10.6% of the population are between 60 and 69 years old, 179 people or 6.6% are between 70 and 79, there are 116 people or 4.3% who are over 80.

As of 2000, there were 934 private households in the municipality, and an average of 2.4 persons per household. In 2000 there were 482 single family homes (or 71.1% of the total) out of a total of 678 inhabited buildings. There were 120 two family buildings (17.7%) and 45 multi-family buildings (6.6%). There were also 31 buildings in the municipality that were multipurpose buildings (used for both housing and commercial or another purpose).

The vacancy rate for the municipality, in 2008, was 0.08%. In 2000 there were 1,079 apartments in the municipality. The most common apartment size was the 4 room apartment of which there were 363. There were 53 single room apartments and 270 apartments with five or more rooms. Of these apartments, a total of 928 apartments (86.0% of the total) were permanently occupied, while 126 apartments (11.7%) were seasonally occupied and 25 apartments (2.3%) were empty. As of 2007, the construction rate of new housing units was 4.7 new units per 1000 residents.

The historical population is given in the following table:

year	population
1591	400
1698	211
1784	300
1850	321
1880	483
1900	405
1950	702
1980	1,476
1990	1,709
2000	2,210

== Heritage sites of national significance ==
The Ottocentesche fortification and the Fortini Della Fame are listed as Swiss heritage sites of national significance.

== Politics ==
In the 2007 federal election the most popular party was the FDP which received 28.1% of the vote. The next three most popular parties were the CVP (24.34%), the SP (21.57%) and the Ticino League (12.74%). In the federal election, a total of 922 votes were cast, and the voter turnout was 54.3%.

In the 2007 Gran Consiglio election, there were a total of 1,701 registered voters in Camorino, of which 1,239 or 72.8% voted. 14 blank ballots and 2 null ballots were cast, leaving 1,223 valid ballots in the election. The most popular party was the PLRT which received 290 or 23.7% of the vote. The next three most popular parties were; the PPD+GenGiova (with 253 or 20.7%), the PS (with 233 or 19.1%) and the SSI (with 232 or 19.0%).

In the 2007 Consiglio di Stato election, there were 18 blank ballots and 2 null ballots, which left 1,219 valid ballots in the election. The most popular party was the PLRT which received 273 or 22.4% of the vote. The next three most popular parties were; the PS (with 268 or 22.0%), the PPD (with 246 or 20.2%) and the SSI (with 207 or 17.0%).

== Economy ==
As of 2007, Camorino had an unemployment rate of 4.7%. As of 2005, there were 71 people employed in the primary economic sector and about 19 businesses involved in this sector. 217 people are employed in the secondary sector and there are 23 businesses in this sector. 666 people are employed in the tertiary sector, with 80 businesses in this sector.

There were 962 residents of the municipality who were employed in some capacity, of which females made up 40.2% of the workforce. In 2000, there were 660 workers who commuted into the municipality and 747 workers who commuted away. The municipality is a net exporter of workers, with about 1.1 workers leaving the municipality for every one entering. About 3.6% of the workforce coming into Camorino are coming from outside Switzerland.

Of the working population, 8% used public transportation to get to work, and 67.8% used a private car.

As of 2009, there was one hotel in Camorino.

== Religion ==
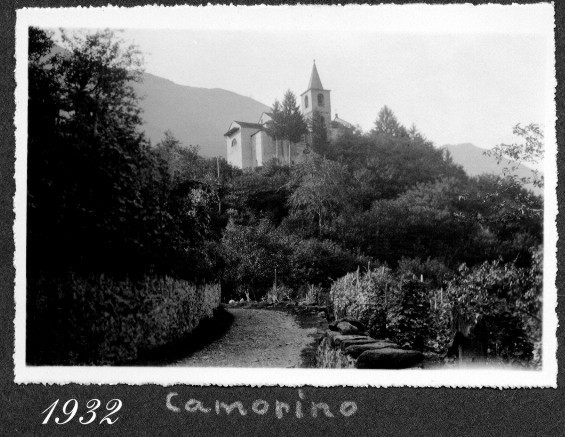
Village church in 1932

From the 2000 census, 1,776 or 80.4% were Roman Catholic, while 118 or 5.3% belonged to the Swiss Reformed Church. There are 246 individuals (or about 11.13% of the population) who belong to another church (not listed on the census), and 70 individuals (or about 3.17% of the population) did not answer the question.

== Education ==
The entire Swiss population is generally well educated. In Camorino about 70.6% of the population (between age 25–64) have completed either non-mandatory upper secondary education or additional higher education (either University or a Fachhochschule).

In Camorino there are a total of 469 students (as of 2009). The Ticino education system provides up to three years of non-mandatory kindergarten and in Camorino there are 73 children in kindergarten.

The primary school program lasts for five years and includes both a standard school and a special school. In the municipality, 160 students attend the standard primary schools and 5 students attend the special school. In the lower secondary school system, students either attend a two-year middle school followed by a two-year pre-apprenticeship or they attend a four-year program to prepare for higher education. There are 113 students in the two-year middle school and in their pre-apprenticeship, while 44 students are in the four-year advanced program.

The upper secondary school includes several options, but at the end of the upper secondary program, a student will be prepared to enter a trade or to continue on to a university or college. In Ticino, vocational students may either attend school while working on their internship or apprenticeship (which takes three or four years) or may attend school followed by an internship or apprenticeship (which takes one year as a full-time student or one and a half to two years as a part-time student).

There are 22 vocational students who are attending school full-time and 46 who attend part-time. The professional program lasts three years and prepares a student for a job in engineering, nursing, computer science, business, tourism and similar fields. There are 6 students in the professional program.

As of 2000, there were 3 students in Camorino who came from another municipality, while 246 residents attended schools outside the municipality.
