= Monte Carasso =

- Former municipality
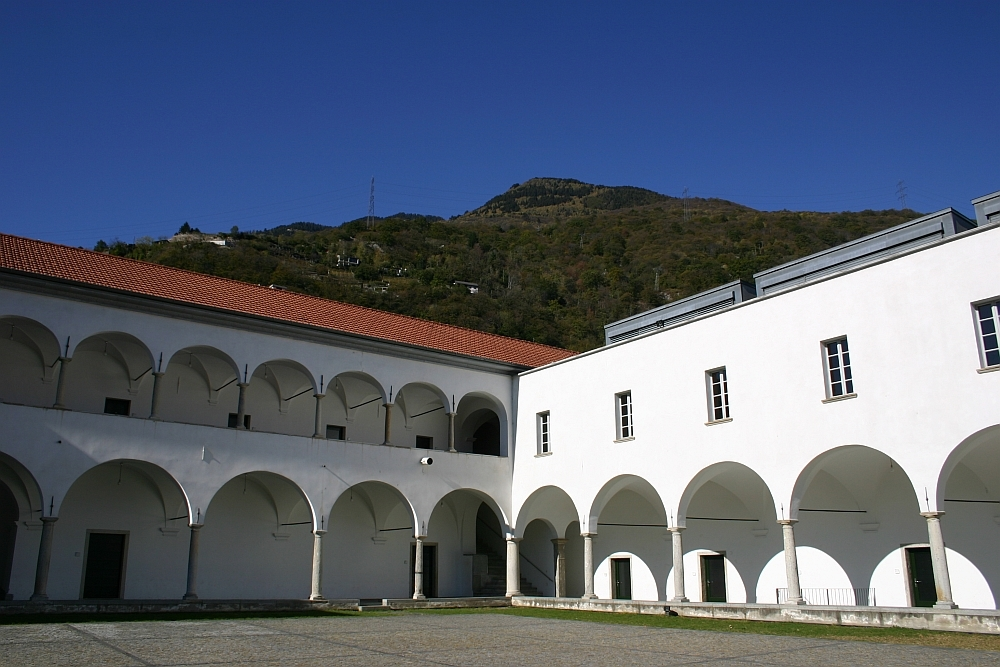
- Monte Carasso

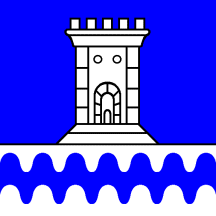
- Flag Coat of arms
- Location of Monte Carasso
- Location within Switzerland Location within Canton of Ticino
- Coordinates: 46°11′N 9°00′E
- Country: Switzerland
- Canton: Ticino
- District: Bellinzona

Government
  - Mayor: Sindaco

Area
  - Total: 9.64 km^{2} (3.72 sq mi)
- Elevation: 237 m (778 ft)

Population (2004)
  - Total: 2,377
  - Density: 247/km^{2} (639/sq mi)
- Time zone: UTC+01:00 (CET)
  - Summer (DST): UTC+02:00 (CEST)
- Postal code: 6513
- SFOS number: 5013
- ISO 3166 code: CH-TI
- Surrounded by: Bellinzona, Cugnasco, Giubiasco, Gorduno, Preonzo, Sementina
- Website: bellinzona.ch

Monte Carasso is a former municipality in the district of Bellinzona in the canton of Ticino in Switzerland.

On 2 April 2017 the former municipalities of Camorino, Claro, Giubiasco, Gnosca, Gorduno, Gudo, Moleno, Pianezzo, Preonzo, Sant'Antonio and Sementina merged into the municipality of Bellinzona.

The Swiss Heritage Society chose Monte Carasso for the 1993 Wakker Prize.

== History ==
Monte Carasso is first mentioned in 1348 as Monte Carassio. In the Middle Ages and the early modern period, the residents of Monte Casasso had a permanent right to appoint representatives in the Council of Bellinzona. The inhabitants of the four village that made up the municipality lived mainly in the various groups on the mountain. As of 1506 the villagers of Monte Carasso possessed transportation rights across the river Ticino. The ferry was an important link across the river, as the Torretta Bridge was destroyed in 1515 and wasn't rebuilt until 1815.

In 1634 the church of Monte Carasso separated from the parish of Bellinzona. The parish church of Saints Bernardino and Jerome was probably built in the late 15th century on the site of a Roman oratory and affiliated with an Augustinian convent. The church separated from the convent of S. Maria Elisabetta in Como in 1555. It was restored in 1905–06.

The church of San Bernardo dates back to the 12th-13th centuries and contains important frescoes of the Seregneser masters from the 15th century. The chapel of Madonna della Valle was built in the 17th century. The Church of SS. Trinità was finished in 1655.

Grazing and cultivation were for centuries the main source of income for the population. From the mid-19th century, there were a large number of former residents who emigrated overseas. To create jobs for the Lombardy refugees in Switzerland, in 1853 the so-called Fortini della fame fortifications were built. After a project by Luigi Snozzi the village was renovated in the 1980s. The first stage, between 1987 and 1993, was the restoration of the former Augustinian convent, which today houses the primary school and cultural center. In 1998 the Fondazione Curzutt was founded with the aim of reviving the old settlement on the Collina Alta above Monte Carasson. In 2000, three quarters of workers were employed outside of the municipality.

== Geography ==
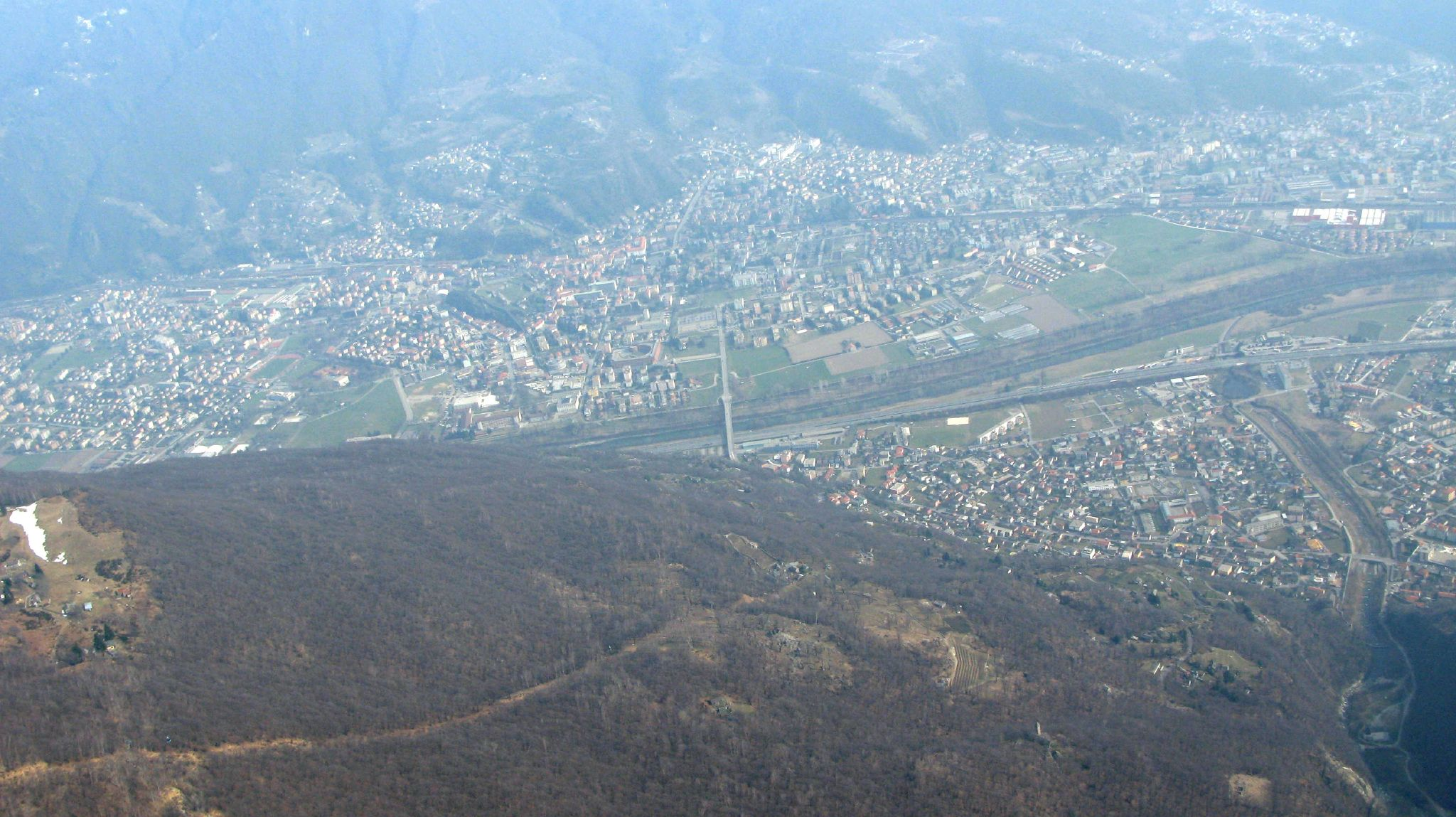
View of Monte Carasso (foreground right), Bellinzona (background left) and Giubiasco.

Aerial view (1946)

Monte Carasso has an area, as of 1997, of 9.64 square kilometers (3.72 sq mi). Of this area, 0.81 km^{2} (0.31 sq mi) or 8.4% is used for agricultural purposes, while 5.91 km^{2} (2.28 sq mi) or 61.3% is forested. Of the rest of the land, 0.66 km^{2} (0.25 sq mi) or 6.8% is settled (buildings or roads), 0.15 km^{2} (37 acres) or 1.6% is either rivers or lakes and 1.78 km^{2} (0.69 sq mi) or 18.5% is unproductive land.

Of the built up area, housing and buildings made up 4.1% and transportation infrastructure made up 1.8%. Out of the forested land, 57.4% of the total land area is heavily forested and 2.1% is covered with orchards or small clusters of trees. Of the agricultural land, 2.2% is used for growing crops, while 2.1% is used for orchards or vine crops and 4.1% is used for alpine pastures. All the water in the municipality is flowing water. Of the unproductive areas, 11.9% is unproductive vegetation and 6.5% is too rocky for vegetation.

The municipality is located in the Bellinzona district, on the right bank of the Ticino. It belongs to the agglomeration of Bellinzona.

== Coat of arms ==
The blazon of the municipal coat of arms is Azure a Tower Argent and on a Base of the same a Bar nebuly of the first.

== Demographics ==
Monte Carasso has a population (as of December 2020) of 2,872. As of 2008, 22.3% of the population are foreign nationals. Over the last 10 years (1997–2007) the population has changed at a rate of 25.3%.

Most of the population (as of 2000) speaks Italian (90.0%), with German being second most common ( 3.5%) and Portuguese being third ( 1.1%). Of the Swiss national languages (as of 2000), 75 speak German, 19 people speak French, 1,920 people speak Italian, and 3 people speak Romansh. The remainder (116 people) speak another language.

As of 2008, the gender distribution of the population was 48.8% male and 51.2% female. The population was made up of 929 Swiss men (36.5% of the population), and 314 (12.3%) non-Swiss men. There were 1,062 Swiss women (41.7%), and 241 (9.5%) non-Swiss women.

In 2008 there were 26 live births to Swiss citizens and 4 births to non-Swiss citizens, and in same time span there were 7 deaths of Swiss citizens and 2 non-Swiss citizen deaths. Ignoring immigration and emigration, the population of Swiss citizens increased by 19 while the foreign population increased by 2. There was 1 Swiss man who emigrated from Switzerland. At the same time, there were 18 non-Swiss men and 8 non-Swiss women who immigrated from another country to Switzerland. The total Swiss population change in 2008 (from all sources) was an increase of 46 and the non-Swiss population change was a decrease of 6 people. This represents a population growth rate of 1.7%.

The age distribution, as of 2009, in Monte Carasso is; 277 children or 10.9% of the population are between 0 and 9 years old and 259 teenagers or 10.2% are between 10 and 19. Of the adult population, 316 people or 12.4% of the population are between 20 and 29 years old. 448 people or 17.6% are between 30 and 39, 434 people or 17.0% are between 40 and 49, and 300 people or 11.8% are between 50 and 59. The senior population distribution is 258 people or 10.1% of the population are between 60 and 69 years old, 152 people or 6.0% are between 70 and 79, there are 102 people or 4.0% who are over 80.

As of 2000, there were 932 private households in the municipality, and an average of 2.3 persons per household. In 2000 there were 545 single family homes (or 72.3% of the total) out of a total of 754 inhabited buildings. There were 128 two family buildings (17.0%) and 57 multi-family buildings (7.6%). There were also 24 buildings in the municipality that were multipurpose buildings (used for both housing and commercial or another purpose).

The vacancy rate for the municipality, in 2008, was 0.72%. In 2000 there were 1,222 apartments in the municipality. The most common apartment size was the 4 room apartment of which there were 466. There were 59 single room apartments and 202 apartments with five or more rooms. Of these apartments, a total of 932 apartments (76.3% of the total) were permanently occupied, while 285 apartments (23.3%) were seasonally occupied and 5 apartments (0.4%) were empty. As of 2007, the construction rate of new housing units was 9.9 new units per 1000 residents.

The historical population is given in the following table:

year	population
1591	709
1784	600
1801	496
1850	619
1900	956
1950	1,064
1990	1,610
2000	2,133

== Heritage sites of national significance ==
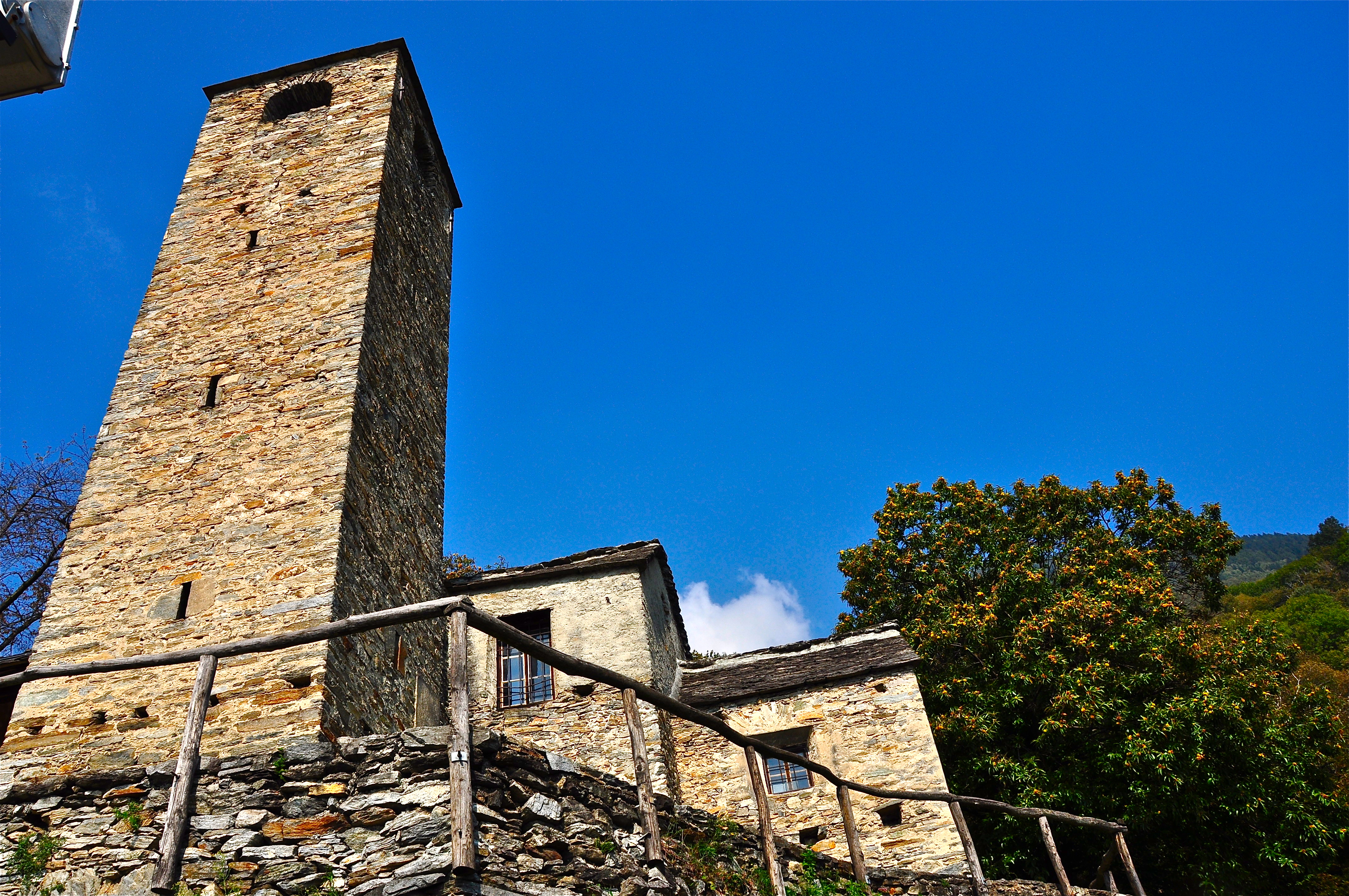
San Bernardo church

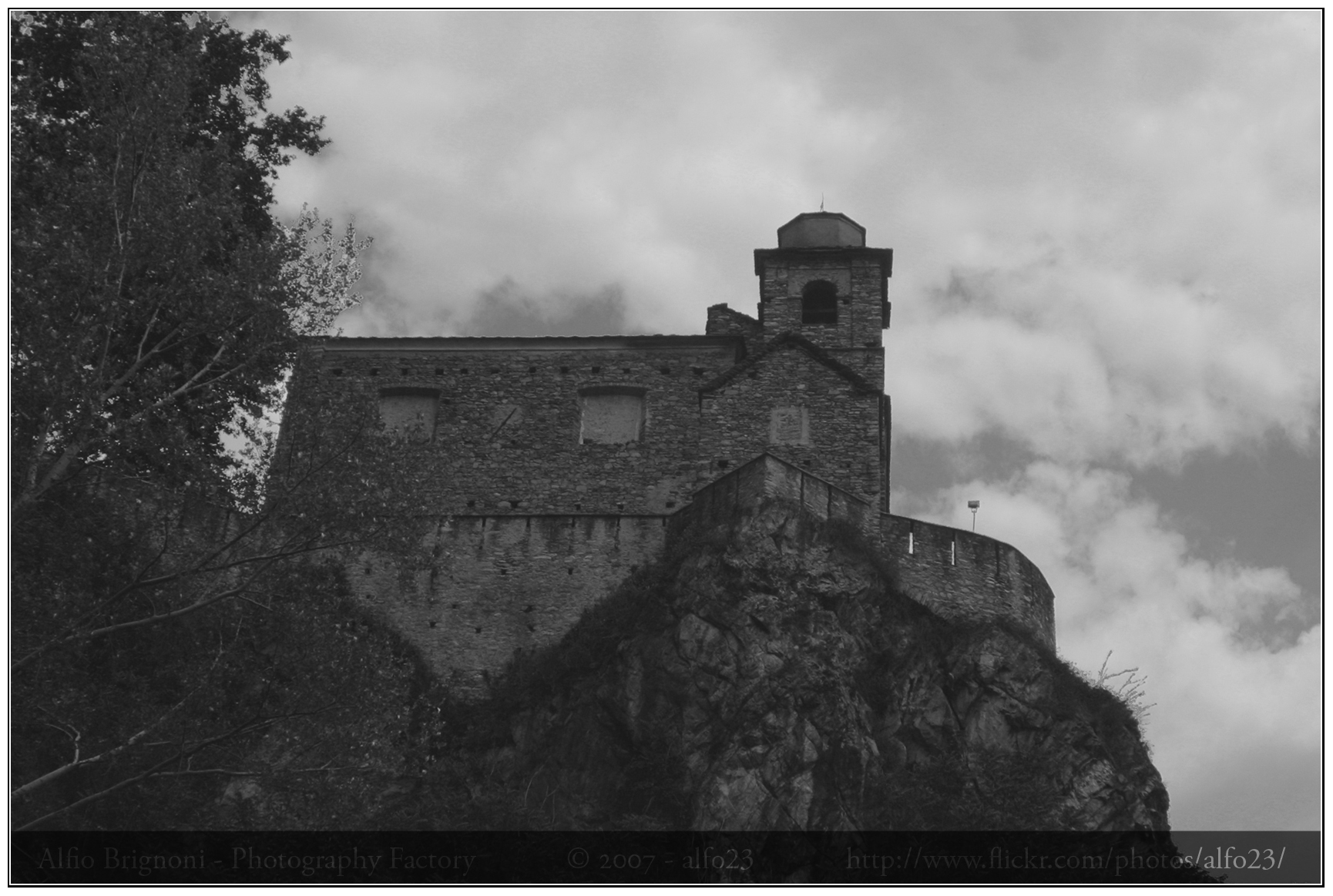
Church of SS. Trinità

The Church of S. Bernardo and the Fortificazioni ottocentesche (known as the Fortini della Fame, shared with Camarino and Sementina) as well as the Church of SS. Trinità are listed as Swiss heritage site of national significance.

== Wakker Prize ==
In 1993 the Swiss Heritage Society chose Monte Carasso for the Wakker Prize. This prize was given in recognition of the municipality's efforts to separate themselves from the growing city of Bellinzona. The Society also noted that the former convent had been extensively renovated and that the village center had been preserved.

== Politics ==
In the 2007 federal election the most popular party was the CVP which received 36.96% of the vote. The next three most popular parties were the FDP (30.84%), the SP (16.58%) and the Ticino League (8.88%). In the federal election, a total of 829 votes were cast, and the voter turnout was 54.7%.

In the 2007 Gran Consiglio election, there were a total of 1,510 registered voters in Monte Carasso, of which 1,111 or 73.6% voted. 33 blank ballots and 3 null ballots were cast, leaving 1,075 valid ballots in the election. The most popular party was the PPD+GenGiova which received 316 or 29.4% of the vote. The next three most popular parties were; the PLRT (with 257 or 23.9%), the SSI (with 184 or 17.1%) and the PS (with 164 or 15.3%).

In the 2007 Consiglio di Stato election, there were 22 blank ballots and 4 null ballots, which left 1,085 valid ballots in the election. The most popular party was the PPD which received 313 or 28.8% of the vote. The next three most popular parties were; the PLRT (with 238 or 21.9%), the PS (with 185 or 17.1%) and the SSI (with 171 or 15.8%).

== Economy ==
As of 2007, Monte Carasso had an unemployment rate of 4.78%. As of 2005, there were 16 people employed in the primary economic sector and about 8 businesses involved in this sector. 149 people are employed in the secondary sector and there are 19 businesses in this sector. 255 people are employed in the tertiary sector, with 51 businesses in this sector. There were 981 residents of the municipality who were employed in some capacity, of which females made up 39.7% of the workforce.

In 2000, there were 250 workers who commuted into the municipality and 776 workers who commuted away. The municipality is a net exporter of workers, with about 3.1 workers leaving the municipality for every one entering. About 6.8% of the workforce coming into Monte Carasso are coming from outside Switzerland. Of the working population, 6.7% used public transportation to get to work, and 68.3% used a private car.

As of 2009, there were 2 hotels in Monte Carasso.

== Religion ==
From the 2000 census, 1,748 or 82.0% were Roman Catholic, while 71 or 3.3% belonged to the Swiss Reformed Church. There are 246 individuals (or about 11.53% of the population) who belong to another church (not listed on the census), and 68 individuals (or about 3.19% of the population) did not answer the question.

== Architecture ==
Like in many other places in Ticino, there are interesting examples of architectural design, such as:

- The Albergo Möwenpick Benjamin and the motorway service area Bellinzona-Sud, on highway A2, designed by architects Bruno Reichlin and Fabio Reinhart in 1989–1990; all the rooms have view to the river Ticino; on the highway the architecture resembles an old castle.

The Monte Carasso Master Plan, by architect Luigi Snozzi, has received the Veronica Rudge Green Prize in Urban Design from Harvard University's Graduate School of Design in 1993 (shared with the redevelopment of Hillside Terrace Complex in Tokyo, Japan, by architect Fumihiko Maki).

== Education ==
In Monte Carasso about 64.7% of the population (between age 25–64) have completed either non-mandatory upper secondary education or additional higher education (either university or a Fachhochschule).

In Monte Carasso there are a total of 422 students (as of 2009). The Ticino education system provides up to three years of non-mandatory kindergarten and in Monte Carasso there are 75 children in kindergarten. The primary school program lasts for five years and includes both a standard school and a special school. In the municipality, 120 students attend the standard primary schools and 9 students attend the special school. In the lower secondary school system, students either attend a two-year middle school followed by a two-year pre-apprenticeship or they attend a four-year program to prepare for higher education. There are 110 students in the two-year middle school and in their pre-apprenticeship, while 41 students are in the four-year advanced program.

The upper secondary school includes several options, but at the end of the upper secondary program, a student will be prepared to enter a trade or to continue on to a university or college. In Ticino, vocational students may either attend school while working on their internship or apprenticeship (which takes three or four years) or may attend school followed by an internship or apprenticeship (which takes one year as a full-time student or one and a half to two years as a part-time student). There are 18 vocational students who are attending school full-time and 41 who attend part-time.

The professional program lasts three years and prepares a student for a job in engineering, nursing, computer science, business, tourism and similar fields. There are 8 students in the professional program.

As of 2000, there were 2 students in Monte Carasso who came from another municipality, while 217 residents attended schools outside the municipality.

== Administration ==
=== Patrician Families ===
Morisoli, Monighetti, Grossi, Guidotti, Rambosio, Rossini, De Prati, Marcionetti, Gioli.
