= Gudo =

- Former municipality

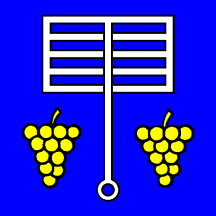
- Flag Coat of arms
- Location of Gudo
- Location within Switzerland Location within Canton of Ticino
- Coordinates: 46°10′N 8°57′E
- Country: Switzerland
- Canton: Ticino
- District: Bellinzona

Government
  - Mayor: Sindaco

Area
  - Total: 9.94 km^{2} (3.84 sq mi)
- Elevation: 232 m (761 ft)

Population (December 2004)
  - Total: 754
  - Density: 75.9/km^{2} (196/sq mi)
- Time zone: UTC+01:00 (CET)
  - Summer (DST): UTC+02:00 (CEST)
- Postal code: 6515
- SFOS number: 5008
- ISO 3166 code: CH-TI
- Surrounded by: Cadenazzo, Cugnasco, Giubiasco, Sant'Antonino, Sementina
- Website: www.bellinzona.ch

Gudo is a former municipality in the district of Bellinzona in the canton of Ticino in Switzerland.

On 2 April 2017 the former municipalities of Camorino, Claro, Giubiasco, Gnosca, Gorduno, Moleno, Monte Carasso, Pianezzo, Preonzo, Sant'Antonio and Sementina merged into the new municipality of Bellinzona.

== History ==
=== Prehistory ===
In 1909–10, work on the banks of the Ticino river in the hamlet of Progero uncovered an extensive prehistoric burial ground. This site, known as A Progero is a Swiss heritage site of national significance. The oldest finds are pottery fragments, indicating that the area was probably inhabited in the Early Bronze Age (17th–16th century BC). The next layer of finds included grave pottery from the Late Bronze Age (13th–12th century BC). Most of the necropolis (over 300 graves) dates from the Iron Age (6th century BC). This settlement is from the Golasecca culture and lasted until about the 2nd century BC. The graves from this period are almost exclusively full-body burials. The graves are surrounded by stone walls and covered with boards or stones arranged around the top. In some cases the stele stones with inscriptions have been found close to the graves.

Many of the late Bronze Age grave goods come in the form of bi-conical, lens-like urns. Typical of the Golasecca era, most graves have one or more ceramic vessels (urns, bowls, mugs and more rarely jugs) along with ornaments made of bronze (brooches, earrings, pendant, belt buckles) and amber (necklaces, earrings and beads). Some of the bronze vessels are situlas (bucket-like containers), but the other typical vessels of the Golasecca culture (such as beak jugs) have not been found. Particularly noteworthy is a bucket (from the turn of the 6th to the 5th century BC) carved with characters in the Lugano or Lepontic.

The cemetery continued to be used after the Golasecca era. Items have been found from the Latène era. When the Celtic groups came across the Alps to the South Alpine region and penetrated the Po Valley, they settled around Gudo and used the cemetery. Grave goods from these eras include ceramic tableware, La Tène type brooches, beads of glass paste and amber, bronze or silver rings and pendants.

=== Medieval Gudo ===
The modern village of Gudo is first mentioned in 1277 as Gudio. In 1264, the Knights Hospitaller of Contone, the council of Como, the cathedrals of Bellinzona and Locarno, and the Locarno noble families of Muralto and Magoria all owned land in Gudo. Gudo documented its citizens' rights in 1363, and Progero is mentioned as a separate community. In Progero the Church of Santa Maria, was rebuilt in the 17th century. Here, according to legend, existed a Benedictine monastery. Gudo and Sementina separated from the mother church in Bellinzona in 1440. Excavations around the parish church of S. Lorenzo in 1992, found a predecessor church from the 6th–7th centuries. This church is the oldest church building that has been archaeologically examined in the Bellinzona area. The present church dates back to 1615 and was restored between 1990 and 2000.

=== Modern Gudo ===
In 1888, the Ticino river natural course was modified, leading to a rise in population. In 1907, an iron bridge was built, which allowed a road to connect the Magadino Plain with Cadenazzo. In 1932–36, the Canton built a farm (Demanio agricolo) in Gudo.

The economy of the municipality is based on agriculture in the Lake Maggiore area. Vineyards grow on the slopes of the town, so at the beginning of the 20th century Gudo was the most important center of Ticino's wine industry. On the right bank of the Ticino River, the microclimate of the Gudese lands is ideal for producing wines of the highest quality. Even today, its vineyards are among the largest in the canton. Dry white Merlot is unique to Ticino, and it is one of the peculiarities of Gudo.

Gudo is primarily a residential community, and in 2000, most residents worked outside the community. The kindergarten and primary school are housed in the municipal government building, there are two hotels, restaurants and a public park with a new playground. Cycling is a popular outdoor activity in Ticino, so there is an e-bike charging point next to Albergo Garni Anita. Gudo, Serta is a bus stop close to the Nucleo - the old centre of Gudo. Gudo, Serta is situated nearby to Progero church of Saint Mary and the village Cugnasco. Gudo, Progero bus stop is close to the school and municipal centre. Gudo, Chiesa bus stop is close to Saint Lawrence Church. A number 311 Bus will take you to Locarno o Bellinzona.

== Geography ==
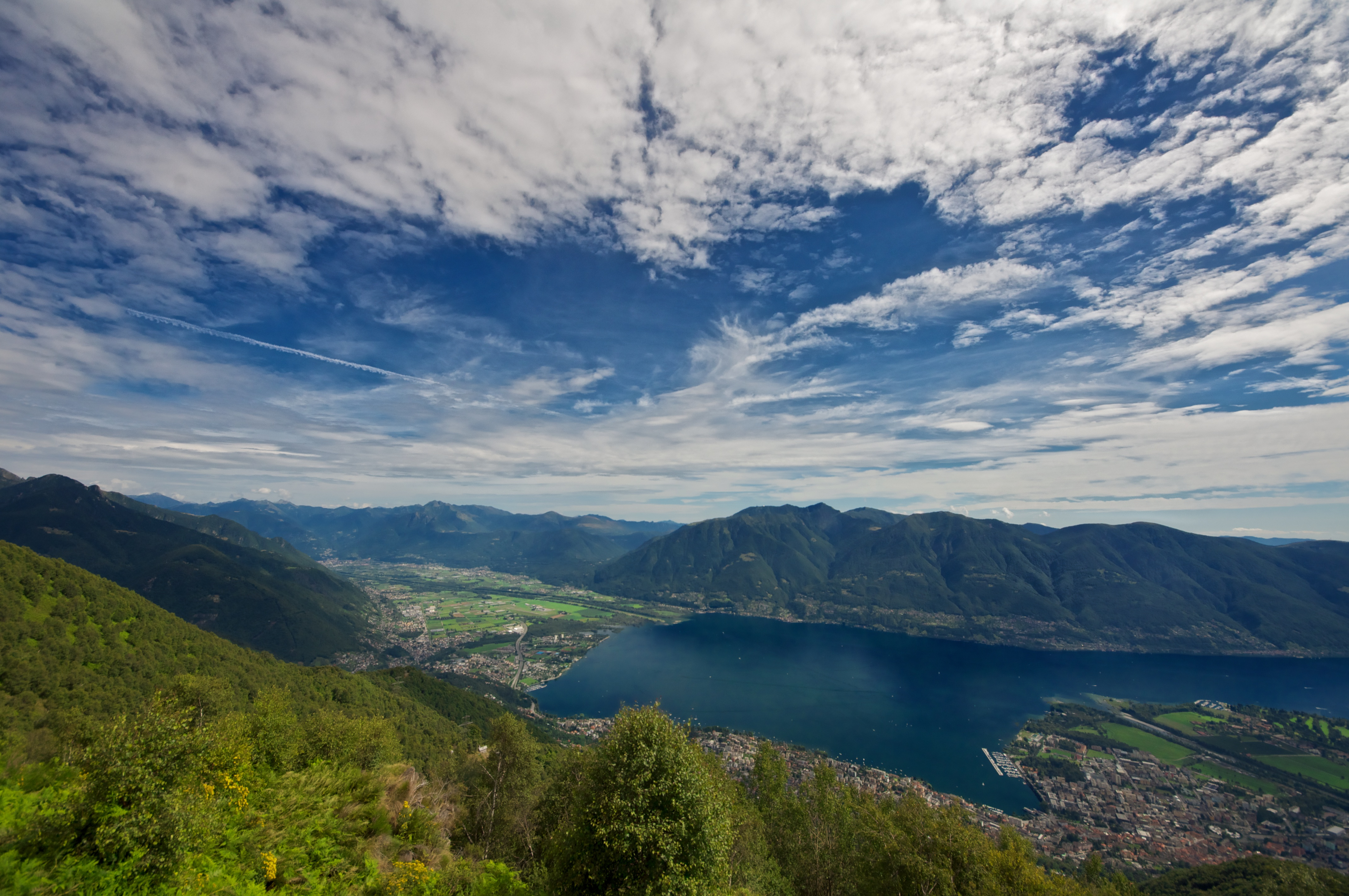
Lake Maggiore. Gudo is located on the left side of the picture in the valley.

Gudo has an area, as of 1997, of 9.94 square kilometers (3.84 sq mi). Of this area, 2.7 km^{2} (1.0 sq mi) or 27.2% is used for agricultural purposes, while 6.06 km^{2} (2.34 sq mi) or 61.0% is forested. Of the rest of the land, 0.54 km^{2} (0.21 sq mi) or 5.4% is settled (buildings or roads), 0.31 km^{2} (0.12 sq mi) or 3.1% is either rivers or lakes and 0.19 km^{2} (0.073 sq mi) or 1.9% is unproductive land.

Of the built up area, housing and buildings made up 2.9% and transportation infrastructure made up 1.7%. Out of the forested land, 57.1% of the total land area is heavily forested and 3.8% is covered with orchards or small clusters of trees. Of the agricultural land, 20.7% is used for growing crops, while 3.5% is used for orchards or vine crops and 2.9% is used for alpine pastures. Of the water in the municipality, 0.5% is in lakes and 2.6% is in rivers and streams. Of the unproductive areas, 1.4% is unproductive vegetation.

The municipality is located in the Bellinzona district, at the foot of the mountains on the right side of Lake Maggiore. It consists of the village of Gudo and several hamlets including Progero.

== Coat of arms ==
The blazon of the municipal coat of arms is Azure a Gril Argent between two Bunches of Grapes Or in base. The grill is an attribute of Saint Lawrence (Santo Lorenzo) who is the Patron Saint of the church of Gudo.

== Demographics ==
Gudo has a population (as of December 2020) of 839. As of 2008, 16.9% of the population are foreign nationals. Over the last 10 years (1997–2007) the population has changed at a rate of 14.3%.

Most of the population (as of 2000) speaks Italian(85.1%), with German being second most common ( 9.6%) and English being third ( 1.2%). Of the Swiss national languages (as of 2000), 65 speak German, 6 people speak French, 578 people speak Italian. The remainder (30 people) speak another language.

As of 2008, the gender distribution of the population was 49.6% male and 50.4% female. The population was made up of 322 Swiss men (39.7% of the population), and 80 (9.9%) non-Swiss men. There were 350 Swiss women (43.2%), and 59 (7.3%) non-Swiss women. In 2008 there were 9 live births to Swiss citizens and 1 birth to non-Swiss citizens, and in same time span there were 2 deaths of Swiss citizens and 1 non-Swiss citizen death. Ignoring immigration and emigration, the population of Swiss citizens increased by 7 while the foreign population remained the same. There were 2 non-Swiss men who immigrated from another country to Switzerland. The total Swiss population change in 2008 (from all sources) was a decrease of 4 and the non-Swiss population change was an increase of 4 people. This represents a population growth rate of 0.0%.

The age distribution, as of 2009, in Gudo is; 82 children or 10.1% of the population are between 0 and 9 years old and 70 teenagers or 8.6% are between 10 and 19. Of the adult population, 79 people or 9.7% of the population are between 20 and 29 years old. 140 people or 17.3% are between 30 and 39, 141 people or 17.4% are between 40 and 49, and 98 people or 12.1% are between 50 and 59. The senior population distribution is 90 people or 11.1% of the population are between 60 and 69 years old, 73 people or 9.0% are between 70 and 79, there are 38 people or 4.7% who are over 80.

As of 2000, there were 304 private households in the municipality, and an average of 2.2 persons per household. In 2000 there were 223 single family homes (or 77.7% of the total) out of a total of 287 inhabited buildings. There were 33 two family buildings (11.5%) and 15 multi-family buildings (5.2%). There were also 16 buildings in the municipality that were multipurpose buildings (used for both housing and commercial or another purpose).

The vacancy rate for the municipality, in 2008, was 0.45%. In 2000 there were 397 apartments in the municipality. The most common apartment size was the 4 room apartment of which there were 121. There were 24 single room apartments and 95 apartments with five or more rooms. Of these apartments, a total of 304 apartments (76.6% of the total) were permanently occupied, while 90 apartments (22.7%) were seasonally occupied and 3 apartments (.8%) were empty. As of 2007, the construction rate of new housing units was 3.8 new units per 1000 residents.

The historical population is given in the following table:

year	population
1671	100
1769	150
1850	296
1880	390
1888	583
1900	373
1950	435
1990	501
1990	501
2000	679

== Heritage sites of national significance ==
The Necropolis A Progero is listed as a Swiss heritage site of national significance.

== Politics ==
In the 2007 federal election the most popular party was the CVP which received 30.48% of the vote. The next three most popular parties were the FDP (30.32%), the SP (14.37%) and the Green Party (8.82%). In the federal election, a total of 244 votes were cast, and the voter turnout was 44.5%.

In the 2007 Gran Consiglio election, there were a total of 558 registered voters in Gudo, of which 353 or 63.3% voted. 8 blank ballots were cast, leaving 345 valid ballots in the election. The most popular party was the PLRT which received 99 or 28.7% of the vote. The next three most popular parties were; the PPD+GenGiova (with 86 or 24.9%), the SSI (with 51 or 14.8%) and the PS (with 43 or 12.5%).

In the 2007 Consiglio di Stato election, there were 5 blank ballots, which left 348 valid ballots in the election. The most popular party was the PLRT which received 88 or 25.3% of the vote. The next three most popular parties were; the PPD (with 84 or 24.1%), the PS (with 56 or 16.1%) and the SSI (with 52 or 14.9%).

== Economy ==
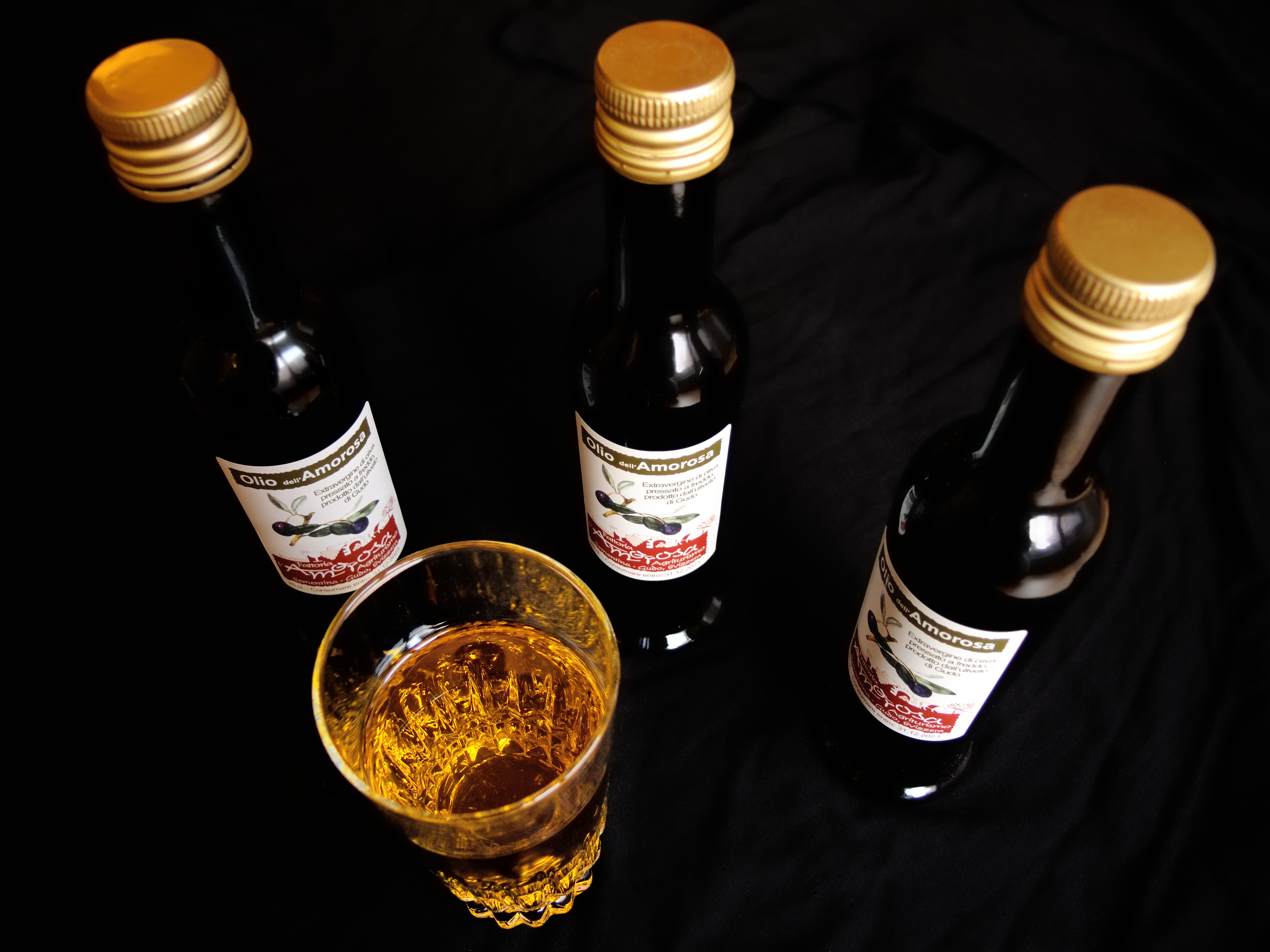
Olive oil from Gudo

As of 2007, Gudo had an unemployment rate of 3.91%. As of 2005, there were 44 people employed in the primary economic sector and about 13 businesses involved in this sector. 24 people are employed in the secondary sector and there are 7 businesses in this sector. 100 people are employed in the tertiary sector, with 21 businesses in this sector.

There were 307 residents of the municipality who were employed in some capacity, of which females made up 36.2% of the workforce. In 2000, there were 75 workers who commuted into the municipality and 232 workers who commuted away. The municipality is a net exporter of workers, with about 3.1 workers leaving the municipality for every one entering. Of the working population, 4.6% used public transportation to get to work, and 73.3% used a private car.

As of 2009, there were 3 hotels in Gudo with a total of 26 rooms and 50 beds.

== Religion ==
From the 2000 census, 520 or 76.6% were Roman Catholic, while 60 or 8.8% belonged to the Swiss Reformed Church. There are 84 individuals (or about 12.37% of the population) who belong to another church (not listed on the census), and 15 individuals (or about 2.21% of the population) did not answer the question.

== Education ==
The entire Swiss population is generally well educated. In Gudo about 73.9% of the population (between age 25-64) have completed either non-mandatory upper secondary education or additional higher education (either university or a Fachhochschule).

In Gudo there are a total of 117 students (as of 2009). The Ticino education system provides up to three years of non-mandatory kindergarten and in Gudo there are 21 children in kindergarten. The primary school program lasts for five years and includes both a standard school and a special school. In the municipality, 38 students attend the standard primary schools and 2 students attend the special school. In the lower secondary school system, students either attend a two-year middle school followed by a two-year pre-apprenticeship or they attend a four-year program to prepare for higher education. There are 21 students in the two-year middle school and in their pre-apprenticeship, while 20 students are in the four-year advanced program.

The upper secondary school includes several options, but at the end of the upper secondary program, a student will be prepared to enter a trade or to continue on to a university or college. In Ticino, vocational students may either attend school while working on their internship or apprenticeship (which takes three or four years) or may attend school followed by an internship or apprenticeship (which takes one year as a full-time student or one and a half to two years as a part-time student).

There are 3 vocational students who are attending school full-time and 9 who attend part-time. The professional program lasts three years and prepares a student for a job in engineering, nursing, computer science, business, tourism and similar fields. There are 3 students in the professional program.

As of 2000, there was 1 student in Gudo who came from another municipality, while 47 residents attended schools outside the municipality.
