= Sant'Antonio, Bellinzona =

Sant'Antonio
- Former municipality
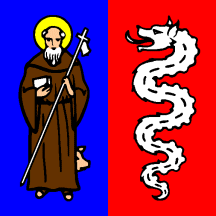
- Flag Coat of arms
- Location of Sant'Antonio
- Location within Switzerland Location within Canton of Ticino
- Coordinates: 46°10′N 9°04′E
- Country: Switzerland
- Canton: Ticino
- District: Bellinzona

Government
  - Mayor: Sindaco

Area
  - Total: 33.58 km^{2} (12.97 sq mi)
- Elevation: 822 m (2,697 ft)

Population (December 2004)
  - Total: 191
  - Density: 5.69/km^{2} (14.7/sq mi)
- Time zone: UTC+01:00 (CET)
  - Summer (DST): UTC+02:00 (CEST)
- Postal code: 6583
- SFOS number: 5018
- ISO 3166 code: CH-TI
- Surrounded by: Arbedo-Castione, Bellinzona, Cadenazzo, Cavargna (IT-CO), Germasino (IT-CO), Medeglia, Pianezzo, Ponte Capriasca, Roveredo (GR), San Nazzaro Val Cavargna (IT-CO)
- Website: bellinzona.ch

Sant'Antonio is a former municipality in the district of Bellinzona in the canton of Ticino in Switzerland. It includes the hamlet of Carena.

On 2 April 2017 the former municipalities of Camorino, Claro, Giubiasco, Gnosca, Gorduno, Gudo, Moleno, Monte Carasso, Pianezzo, Preonzo and Sementina merged into the municipality of Bellinzona.

== History ==
A grave from the Early Iron Age (750-400 BC) has been discovered in the village. The so-called Squadra or part of the village made up the medieval municipality of Vallemorobbia. In 1803, it became a part of the political municipality of Vallemorobbia. Sant'Antonio became an independent municipality in 1831. Before 1600 the village part of the parish of Bellinzona, followed by the parish of Pianezzo until 1680. The first mention of the parish church of SS Antonio Abate e Abbondio is in 1371, and the church was rebuilt in the 16th Century. The inhabitants of the village lived on grazing and farming or many emigrated. In 1464, iron ore mining began in Carena, which was operated with varying success and various owners until 1831. The alpine pasture of Giumello, which belongs to the Canton and the cantonal Agricultural School at Mezzana, is located in the municipality. In 2000, over three quarters of the workforce were commuters, especially to Bellinzona.

== Geography ==
Sant'Antonio has an area, as of 1997, of 33.58 square kilometers (12.97 sq mi). Of this area, 0.44 km^{2} (0.17 sq mi) or 1.3% is used for agricultural purposes, while 26.63 km^{2} (10.28 sq mi) or 79.3% is forested. Of the rest of the land, 0.22 km^{2} (0.085 sq mi) or 0.7% is settled (buildings or roads), 0.23 km^{2} (0.089 sq mi) or 0.7% is either rivers or lakes and 3.28 km^{2} (1.27 sq mi) or 9.8% is unproductive land.

Of the built up area, housing and buildings made up 0.4% and transportation infrastructure made up 0.2%. Out of the forested land, 55.7% of the total land area is heavily forested, while 22.1% is covered in small trees and shrubbery and 1.6% is covered with orchards or small clusters of trees. Of the agricultural land, 0.9% is used for growing crops. All the water in the municipality is flowing water. Of the unproductive areas, 8.9% is unproductive vegetation.

The municipality is located in the Bellinzona district on the heights above the right side of the upper Morobbia valley. It includes the Carena mountain, which is 958 m (3,143 ft). It consists of the village of Sant'Antonio and the several hamlets.

== Coat of arms ==
The blazon of the municipal coat of arms is Per pale Azure St. Anthony statant clead as a Monk haloed Or holding a staff and a book argent and behind him a Pig proper and Gules a Snake Argent. Saint Anthony is the protector of animals, also known as Saint Anthony of the pig due to the classical iconography which always depicts him surrounded by animals, in particular by a little pig whose snout sticks out from the saint's clothes as on the coat of arms of Sant'Antonio.

== Demographics ==
Sant'Antonio has a population (as of December 2020) of 234. As of 2008, 6.0% of the population are foreign nationals. Over the last 10 years (1997–2007) the population has changed at a rate of 12.1%.

Most of the population (as of 2000) speaks Italian(76.8%), with German being second most common (20.8%) and Romansh being third ( 0.6%). Of the Swiss national languages (as of 2000), 35 speak German, 129 people speak Italian, and 1 person speaks Romansh. The remainder (3 people) speak another language.

As of 2008, the gender distribution of the population was 52.2% male and 47.8% female. The population was made up of 95 Swiss men (46.8% of the population), and 11 (5.4%) non-Swiss men. There were 91 Swiss women (44.8%), and 6 (3.0%) non-Swiss women.

In 2008 there was 1 live birth to a Swiss citizen and in same time span there were 4 deaths of Swiss citizens. Ignoring immigration and emigration, the population of Swiss citizens decreased by 3 while the foreign population remained the same. There was 1 Swiss man who immigrated back to Switzerland and 1 non-Swiss man who immigrated from another country to Switzerland. The total Swiss population change in 2008 (from all sources) was a decrease of 2 and the non-Swiss population change was a decrease of 1 people. This represents a population growth rate of -1.5%.

The age distribution, as of 2009, in Sant'Antonio is; 11 children or 5.4% of the population are between 0 and 9 years old and 22 teenagers or 10.8% are between 10 and 19. Of the adult population, 12 people or 5.9% of the population are between 20 and 29 years old. 25 people or 12.3% are between 30 and 39, 33 people or 16.3% are between 40 and 49, and 33 people or 16.3% are between 50 and 59. The senior population distribution is 36 people or 17.7% of the population are between 60 and 69 years old, 19 people or 9.4% are between 70 and 79, there are 12 people or 5.9% who are over 80.

As of 2000, there were 88 private households in the municipality, and an average of 1.9 persons per household. In 2000 there were 303 single family homes (or 93.2% of the total) out of a total of 325 inhabited buildings. There were 11 two family buildings (3.4%) and 2 multi-family buildings (.6%). There were also 9 buildings in the municipality that were multipurpose buildings (used for both housing and commercial or another purpose).

The vacancy rate for the municipality, in 2008, was 0%. In 2000 there were 335 apartments in the municipality. The most common apartment size was the 3 room apartment of which there were 139. There were 21 single room apartments and 34 apartments with five or more rooms. Of these apartments, a total of 87 apartments (26.0% of the total) were permanently occupied, while 247 apartments (73.7%) were seasonally occupied and 1 apartments (0.3%) were empty. As of 2007, the construction rate of new housing units was 0 new units per 1000 residents.

The historical population is given in the following table:

year	population
1653	550
1761	300
1850	688
1870	763
1900	599
1950	346
2000	168

== Heritage sites of national significance ==
The ancient mine at A Carena is listed as a Swiss heritage site of national significance.

== Politics ==
In the 2007 federal election the most popular party was the FDP which received 49.63% of the vote. The next three most popular parties were the CVP (23.32%), the SP (11.01%) and the SVP (6.34%). In the federal election, a total of 69 votes were cast, and the voter turnout was 40.4%.

In the 2007 Gran Consiglio election, there were a total of 165 registered voters in Sant'Antonio, of which 110 or 66.7% voted. 2 blank ballots were cast, leaving 108 valid ballots in the election. The most popular party was the PLRT which received 39 or 36.1% of the vote. The next three most popular parties were; the SSI (with 25 or 23.1%), the PS (with 15 or 13.9%) and the PPD+GenGiova (with 12 or 11.1%).

In the 2007 Consiglio di Stato election, there were 2 blank ballots, which left 108 valid ballots in the election. The most popular party was the PLRT which received 38 or 35.2% of the vote. The next three most popular parties were; the SSI (with 22 or 20.4%), the PS (with 15 or 13.9%) and the PPD (with 13 or 12.0%).

== Economy ==
As of 2007, Sant'Antonio had an unemployment rate of 3.84%. As of 2005, there were 15 people employed in the primary economic sector and about 4 businesses involved in this sector. 1 person is employed in the secondary sector and there is 1 business in this sector. 3 people are employed in the tertiary sector, with 2 businesses in this sector. There were 61 residents of the municipality who were employed in some capacity, of which females made up 42.6% of the workforce.

In 2000, there were 0 workers who commuted into the municipality and 47 workers who commuted away. The municipality is a net exporter of workers, with all workers leaving the municipality. Of the working population, 3.3% used public transportation to get to work, and 70.5% used a private car.

As of 2009, there were 2 hotels in Sant'Antonio.

== Religion ==
From the 2000 census, 127 or 75.6% were Roman Catholic, while 13 or 7.7% belonged to the Swiss Reformed Church. There are 25 individuals (or about 14.88% of the population) who belong to another church (not listed on the census), and 3 individuals (or about 1.79% of the population) did not answer the question.

== Education ==
In Sant'Antonio about 70.4% of the population (between age 25–64) have completed either non-mandatory upper secondary education or additional higher education (either university or a Fachhochschule).

In Sant'Antonio there are a total of 26 students (as of 2009). The Ticino education system provides up to three years of non-mandatory kindergarten and in Sant'Antonio there are 5 children in kindergarten. The primary school program lasts for five years and includes both a standard school and a special school. In the municipality, 4 students attend the standard primary schools and students attend the special school. In the lower secondary school system, students either attend a two-year middle school followed by a two-year pre-apprenticeship or they attend a four-year program to prepare for higher education. There are 6 students in the two-year middle school and in their pre-apprenticeship, while 2 students are in the four-year advanced program.

The upper secondary school includes several options, but at the end of the upper secondary program, a student will be prepared to enter a trade or to continue on to a university or college. In Ticino, vocational students may either attend school while working on their internship or apprenticeship (which takes three or four years) or may attend school followed by an internship or apprenticeship (which takes one year as a full-time student or one and a half to two years as a part-time student). There are 4 vocational students who are attending school full-time and 5 who attend part-time.

As of 2000, 29 students from Sant'Antonio attended schools outside the municipality.
