= Gorduno =

Former Swiss municipality

- Former municipality
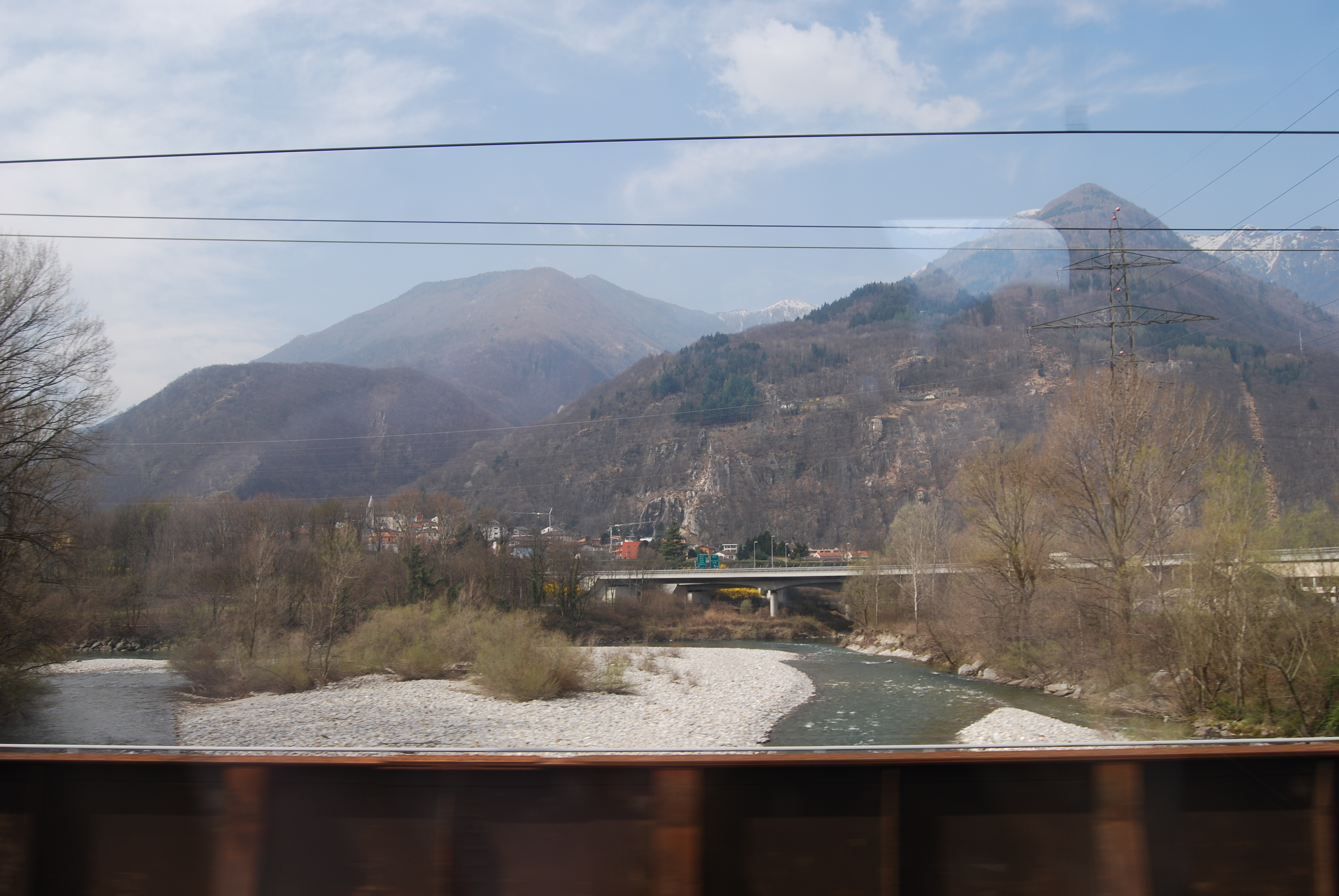

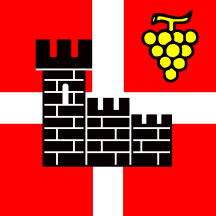
- Flag Coat of arms
- Location of Gorduno
- Location within Switzerland Location within Canton of Ticino
- Coordinates: 46°13′N 9°02′E
- Country: Switzerland
- Canton: Ticino
- District: Bellinzona

Government
  - Mayor: Sindaco

Area
  - Total: 9.2 km^{2} (3.6 sq mi)
- Elevation: 284 m (932 ft)

Population (December 2004)
  - Total: 682
  - Density: 74/km^{2} (190/sq mi)
- Time zone: UTC+01:00 (CET)
  - Summer (DST): UTC+02:00 (CEST)
- Postal code: 6518
- SFOS number: 5007
- ISO 3166 code: CH-TI
- Surrounded by: Arbedo-Castione, Bellinzona, Gnosca, Monte Carasso, Preonzo
- Website: www.bellinzona.ch

Gorduno is a former municipality in the district of Bellinzona in the canton of Ticino in Switzerland.

On 2 April 2017 the former municipalities of Camorino, Claro, Giubiasco, Gnosca, Gudo, Moleno, Monte Carasso, Pianezzo, Preonzo, Sant'Antonio and Sementina merged into the municipality of Bellinzona.

== History ==
The area around Gorduno was prehistorically settled, though very little is known about the earlier settlements. The modern municipality of Gorduno is first mentioned in 1182 as medius locus de Gorduno. It was first mentioned in the dispute between the churches of Como and Milan, which was settled by the verdict of 1202. In the verdict Como received the little church of SS Maurizio e Carpoforo in the so-called Castle of Gnosca, which, contrary to the name, was in the territory of Gorduno. The church was strategically located on the Ticino river. In the Late Middle Ages, Gorduno was a municipality in the County of Bellinzona. In 1374, the municipality was combined with Gnosca and placed under the control of Podestà, a canon of Milan. This placed the church under the Ambrosian Rite of the Diocese of Milan. The village had completely split from the community celebrating according to the Roman Rite in Bellinzona by 1538-83. The parish functions moved from the Castle Church to the village church of SS Sebastiano e Rocco.

== Geography ==
Aerial view (1953)

Gorduno has an area, as of 1997, of 9.22 square kilometers (3.56 sq mi). Of this area, 0.65 km^{2} (0.25 sq mi) or 7.0% is used for agricultural purposes, while 6.64 km^{2} (2.56 sq mi) or 72.0% is forested. Of the rest of the land, 0.55 km^{2} (0.21 sq mi) or 6.0% is settled (buildings or roads), 0.14 km^{2} (35 acres) or 1.5% is either rivers or lakes and 1.04 km^{2} (0.40 sq mi) or 11.3% is unproductive land.

Of the built up area, housing and buildings made up 2.2% and transportation infrastructure made up 3.0%. Out of the forested land, 64.9% of the total land area is heavily forested and 1.3% is covered with orchards or small clusters of trees. Of the agricultural land, 4.6% is used for growing crops and 2.2% is used for alpine pastures. All the water in the municipality is flowing water. Of the unproductive areas, 8.0% is unproductive vegetation and 3.3% is too rocky for vegetation.

== Coat of arms ==
The blazon of the municipal coat of arms is Gules a Cross Argent overall a Castle embatteled Sable with one tower on sinister and in chief sinister a Bunch of Grapes slipped Or.

== Demographics ==
Gorduno has a population (as of December 2020) of 817. As of 2008, 13.6% of the population are foreign nationals. Over the last 10 years (1997–2007) the population has changed at a rate of 5.3%.

Most of the population (as of 2000) speaks Italian(93.9%), with German being second most common ( 2.7%) and French being third ( 1.4%). Of the Swiss national languages (as of 2000), 17 speak German, 9 people speak French, 583 people speak Italian, and 1 person speaks Romansh. The remainder (11 people) speak another language.

As of 2008, the gender distribution of the population was 48.5% male and 51.5% female. The population was made up of 304 Swiss men (41.4% of the population), and 52 (7.1%) non-Swiss men. There were 329 Swiss women (44.8%), and 49 (6.7%) non-Swiss women.

In 2008 there were 6 live births to Swiss citizens and births to non-Swiss citizens, and in same time span there were 5 deaths of Swiss citizens. Ignoring immigration and emigration, the population of Swiss citizens increased by 1 while the foreign population remained the same. There was 1 Swiss man, 1 Swiss woman who emigrated from Switzerland to another country, 2 non-Swiss men who emigrated from Switzerland to another country and 3 non-Swiss women who emigrated from Switzerland to another country. The total Swiss population change in 2008 (from all sources) was an increase of 15 and the non-Swiss population change was an increase of 10 people. This represents a population growth rate of 3.6%.

The age distribution, as of 2009, in Gorduno is; 76 children or 10.4% of the population are between 0 and 9 years old and 74 teenagers or 10.1% are between 10 and 19. Of the adult population, 99 people or 13.5% of the population are between 20 and 29 years old. 113 people or 15.4% are between 30 and 39, 109 people or 14.9% are between 40 and 49, and 105 people or 14.3% are between 50 and 59. The senior population distribution is 84 people or 11.4% of the population are between 60 and 69 years old, 58 people or 7.9% are between 70 and 79, there are 16 people or 2.2% who are over 80.

As of 2000, there were 258 private households in the municipality, and an average of 2.4 persons per household. In 2000 there were 297 single family homes (or 82.7% of the total) out of a total of 359 inhabited buildings. There were 39 two family buildings (10.9%) and 16 multi-family buildings (4.5%). There were also 7 buildings in the municipality that were multipurpose buildings (used for both housing and commercial or another purpose).

The vacancy rate for the municipality, in 2008, was 0%. In 2000 there were 448 apartments in the municipality. The most common apartment size was the 4 room apartment of which there were 126. There were 24 single room apartments and 98 apartments with five or more rooms. Of these apartments, a total of 256 apartments (57.1% of the total) were permanently occupied, while 186 apartments (41.5%) were seasonally occupied and 6 apartments (1.3%) were empty. As of 2007, the construction rate of new housing units was 5.8 new units per 1000 residents.

The historical population is given in the following table:

| year | population |
|---|---|
| 1591 | 400 |
| 1801 | 262 |
| 1850 | 299 |
| 1900 | 426 |
| 1950 | 467 |
| 2000 | 621 |

== Politics ==
In the 2007 federal election the most popular party was the FDP which received 35.96% of the vote. The next three most popular parties were the CVP (35.26%), the SP (15.89%) and the Ticino League (8.52%). In the federal election, a total of 269 votes were cast, and the voter turnout was 54.3%.

In the 2007 Gran Consiglio election, there were a total of 490 registered voters in Gorduno, of which 388 or 79.2% voted. 7 blank ballots and 1 null ballots were cast, leaving 380 valid ballots in the election. The most popular party was the PLRT which received 129 or 33.9% of the vote. The next three most popular parties were; the PPD+GenGiova (with 95 or 25.0%), the SSI (with 63 or 16.6%) and the PS (with 52 or 13.7%).

In the 2007 Consiglio di Stato election, there were 4 blank ballots and 2 null ballots, which left 382 valid ballots in the election. The most popular party was the PLRT which received 115 or 30.1% of the vote. The next three most popular parties were; the PPD (with 95 or 24.9%), the PS (with 67 or 17.5%) and the SSI (with 57 or 14.9%).

== Economy ==
As of 2007, Gorduno had an unemployment rate of 4.22%. As of 2005, there were 3 people employed in the primary economic sector and about 2 businesses involved in this sector. 12 people are employed in the secondary sector and there are 3 businesses in this sector. 49 people are employed in the tertiary sector, with 14 businesses in this sector.

There were 284 residents of the municipality who were employed in some capacity, of which females made up 43.3% of the workforce. In 2000, there were 36 workers who commuted into the municipality and 249 workers who commuted away. The municipality is a net exporter of workers, with about 6.9 workers leaving the municipality for every one entering. Of the working population, 7.4% used public transportation to get to work, and 74.3% used a private car.

As of 2009, there was one hotel in Gorduno.

== Religion ==
From the 2000 census, 563 or 90.7% were Roman Catholic, while 13 or 2.1% belonged to the Swiss Reformed Church. There are 32 individuals (or about 5.15% of the population) who belong to another church (not listed on the census), and 13 individuals (or about 2.09% of the population) did not answer the question.

== Education ==
The entire Swiss population is generally well educated. In Gorduno about 77.4% of the population (between age 25-64) have completed either non-mandatory upper secondary education or additional higher education (either university or a Fachhochschule).

In Gorduno there are a total of 135 students (as of 2009). The Ticino education system provides up to three years of non-mandatory kindergarten and in Gorduno there are 23 children in kindergarten. The primary school program lasts for five years and includes both a standard school and a special school. In the municipality, 35 students attend the standard primary schools and 1 students attend the special school. In the lower secondary school system, students either attend a two-year middle school followed by a two-year pre-apprenticeship or they attend a four-year program to prepare for higher education. There are 34 students in the two-year middle school and in their pre-apprenticeship, while 17 students are in the four-year advanced program.

The upper secondary school includes several options, but at the end of the upper secondary program, a student will be prepared to enter a trade or to continue on to a university or college. In Ticino, vocational students may either attend school while working on their internship or apprenticeship (which takes three or four years) or may attend school followed by an internship or apprenticeship (which takes one year as a full-time student or one and a half to two years as a part-time student). There are 7 vocational students who are attending school full-time and 14 who attend part-time.

The professional program lasts three years and prepares a student for a job in engineering, nursing, computer science, business, tourism and similar fields. There are 4 students in the professional program.

As of 2000, there was 1 student in Gorduno who came from another municipality, while 71 residents attended schools outside the municipality.
