= Cadenazzo =

- Municipality
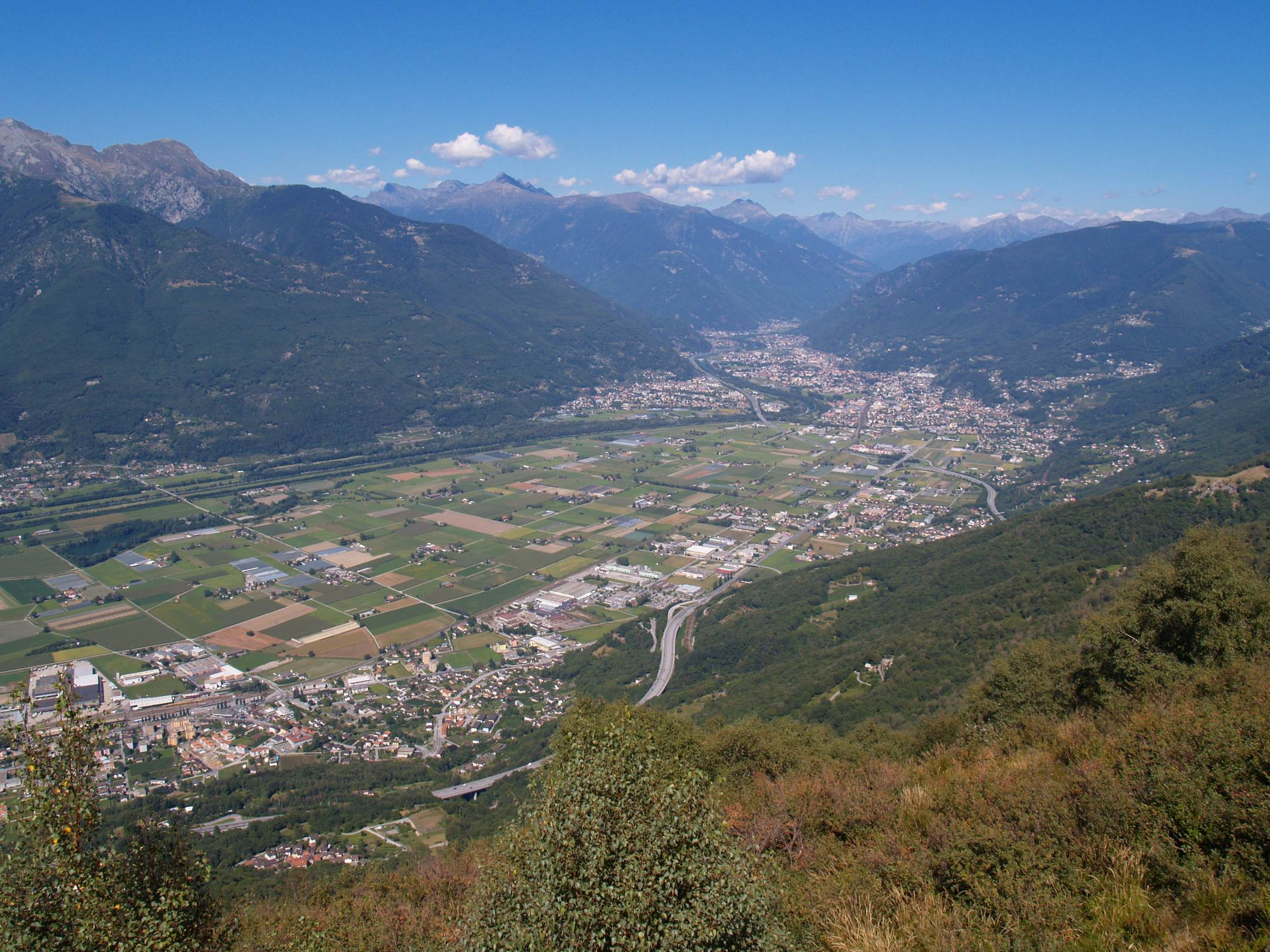

- Flag Coat of arms
- Location of Cadenazzo
- Location within Switzerland Location within Canton of Ticino
- Coordinates: 46°9′N 8°57′E
- Country: Switzerland
- Canton: Ticino
- District: Bellinzona

Government
  - Mayor: Sindaco

Area
  - Total: 8.37 km^{2} (3.23 sq mi)
- Elevation: 215 m (705 ft)

Population (December 2007)
  - Total: 2,206
  - Density: 264/km^{2} (683/sq mi)
- Time zone: UTC+01:00 (CET)
  - Summer (DST): UTC+02:00 (CEST)
- Postal code: 6593
- SFOS number: 5003
- ISO 3166 code: CH-TI
- Surrounded by: Bironico, Camorino, Contone, Cugnasco, Gudo, Isone, Locarno, Medeglia, Pianezzo, Ponte Capriasca, Rivera, Sant'Antonino, Sant'Antonio
- Website: www.cadenazzo.ch

Cadenazzo is a municipality in the district of Bellinzona, in the canton of Ticino in Switzerland. On 13 March 2005 the formerly independent municipality of Robasacco was absorbed into Cadenazzo.

== History ==
Cadenazzo is first mentioned in 1335 as Catenacii, when the hospitallis de Cadenazio was mentioned. The existence of a medieval castle is in doubt. The collegiate church of San Pietro in Bellinzona owned part of the village by 1438. The chapel of S. Pietro Martire in Cadenazzo may have been built in the 13th century, but the earliest mention of the chapel is from 1363. However, the chapel has not survived into the modern era and its location is unknown. In 1442, Cadenazzo separated from the mother church of Bellinzona joined the parish of the neighboring village of S. Antonino. They remained part of a joint parish until 1830.

Agriculture, once dominant, but not very profitable, is still common in the Magadino valley. Crop yields increased after the correction of Ticino river. Since 1973, Cadenazzo has been home to a branch of the Swiss Federal Research Station for Agroecology and Agriculture. Due to some industrial enterprises, shops and warehouses in the vicinity of the train station, Cadenazzo draw commuters from surrounding communities.

Aerial view (1964)

== Geography ==
Cadenazzo has an area, as of 1997, of 8.37 square kilometers (3.23 sq mi). Of this area, 2.47 km^{2} (0.95 sq mi) or 29.5% is used for agricultural purposes, while 2.05 km^{2} (0.79 sq mi) or 24.5% is forested. Of the rest of the land, 1.25 km^{2} (0.48 sq mi) or 14.9% is settled (buildings or roads), 0.11 km^{2} (27 acres) or 1.3% is either rivers or lakes and 0.1 km^{2} (25 acres) or 1.2% is unproductive land.

Of the built up area, industrial buildings made up 3.7% of the total area while housing and buildings made up 4.9% and transportation infrastructure made up 5.1%. Out of the forested land, 22.8% of the total land area is heavily forested and 1.1% is covered with orchards or small clusters of trees. Of the agricultural land, 20.8% is used for growing crops, while 3.8% is used for orchards or vine crops and 4.9% is used for alpine pastures. All the water in the municipality is flowing water. Of the unproductive areas, 1.1% is unproductive vegetation.

The municipality is located in the Bellinzona district, along a road along the north foot of the Monte Ceneri.

== Coat of arms ==
The blazon of the municipal coat of arms after 2005 is Azure a pale argent and overall a castellated gateway between two turrets party per pale gules and or. The two previous coats of arms which this replaced were, for Cadenazzo: Azure a pale argent and overall a castellated gateway between two turrets gules; and for Robasacco: Azure an arm embowed vested gules issuant from the dexter holding a moneybag or.

== Demographics ==
Cadenazzo has a population (as of December 2020) of 2,998. As of 2008, 36.2% of the population are foreign nationals. Over the last 10 years (1997–2007) the population has changed at a rate of 18.9%. Most of the population (as of 2000) speaks Italian (81.4%), with German being second most common ( 5.2%) and Albanian being third ( 3.3%).

Of the Swiss national languages (as of 2000), 92 speak German 27 people speak French, 1,417 people speak Italian, and 1 person speaks Romansh. The remainder (218 people) speak another language.

As of 2008, the gender distribution of the population was 51.2% male and 48.8% female. The population was made up of 749 Swiss men (31.9% of the population), and 453 (19.3%) non-Swiss men. There were 759 Swiss women (32.3%), and 386 (16.4%) non-Swiss women.

In 2008 there were 15 live births to Swiss citizens and 5 births to non-Swiss citizens, and in same time span there were 10 deaths of Swiss citizens and 3 non-Swiss citizen deaths. Ignoring immigration and emigration, the population of Swiss citizens increased by 5 while the foreign population increased by 2. There were 2 Swiss men who emigrated from Switzerland to another country, 2 Swiss women who emigrated from Switzerland to another country, 13 non-Swiss men who emigrated from Switzerland to another country and 12 non-Swiss women who emigrated from Switzerland to another country. The total Swiss population change in 2008 (from all sources) was an increase of 76 and the non-Swiss population change was a decrease of 3 people. This represents a population growth rate of 3.3%.

The age distribution, as of 2009, in Cadenazzo is; 256 children or 10.9% of the population are between 0 and 9 years old and 255 teenagers or 10.9% are between 10 and 19. Of the adult population, 333 people or 14.2% of the population are between 20 and 29 years old. 330 people or 14.1% are between 30 and 39, 427 people or 18.2% are between 40 and 49, and 345 people or 14.7% are between 50 and 59. The senior population distribution is 196 people or 8.4% of the population are between 60 and 69 years old, 115 people or 4.9% are between 70 and 79, there are 90 people or 3.8% who are over 80.

As of 2000, there were 741 private households in the municipality, and an average of 2.4 persons per household. In 2000 there were 274 single family homes (or 67.7% of the total) out of a total of 405 inhabited buildings. There were 55 two family buildings (13.6%) and 41 multi-family buildings (10.1%). There were also 35 buildings in the municipality that were multipurpose buildings (used for both housing and commercial or another purpose).

The vacancy rate for the municipality, in 2008, was 1.33%. In 2000 there were 805 apartments in the municipality. Of these apartments, a total of 683 apartments (84.8% of the total) were permanently occupied, while 99 apartments (12.3%) were seasonally occupied and 23 apartments (2.9%) were empty. The most common apartment size was the 4 room apartment of which there were 293. There were 27 single room apartments and 134 apartments with five or more rooms. As of 2007, the construction rate of new housing units was 28.6 new units per 1000 residents.

The historical population is given in the following table:

year	population
1698	191
1784	200
1850	216
1900	333
1950	621
1990	1,500
2000	1,755

== Politics ==
In the 2007 federal election the most popular party was the FDP which received 38.74% of the vote. The next three most popular parties were the CVP (23.01%), the Ticino League (13.22%) and the SP (11.64%). In the federal election, a total of 479 votes were cast, and the voter turnout was 42.3%.

In the 2007 Gran Consiglio election, there were a total of 1,113 registered voters in Cadenazzo, of which 731 or 65.7% voted. 11 blank ballots and 1 null ballots were cast, leaving 719 valid ballots in the election. The most popular party was the PLRT which received 252 or 35.0% of the vote. The next three most popular parties were; the PPD+GenGiova (with 124 or 17.2%), the SSI (with 118 or 16.4%) and the LEGA (with 94 or 13.1%).

In the 2007 Consiglio di Stato election, there were 5 blank ballots and 2 null ballots, which left 724 valid ballots in the election. The most popular party was the PLRT which received 236 or 32.6% of the vote. The next three most popular parties were; the LEGA (with 152 or 21.0%), the PPD (with 130 or 18.0%) and the SSI (with 88 or 12.2%).

== Economy ==
As of 2007, Cadenazzo had an unemployment rate of 5.58%. As of 2005, there were 83 people employed in the primary economic sector and about 20 businesses involved in this sector. 181 people are employed in the secondary sector and there are 27 businesses in this sector. 634 people are employed in the tertiary sector, with 112 businesses in this sector.

There were 897 residents of the municipality who were employed in some capacity, of which females made up 36.8% of the workforce. In 2000, there were 917 workers who commuted into the municipality and 600 workers who commuted away. The municipality is a net importer of workers, with about 1.5 workers entering the municipality for every one leaving. About 13.0% of the workforce coming into Cadenazzo are coming from outside Switzerland. Of the working population, 8.4% used public transportation to get to work, and 52.7% used a private car.

As of 2009, there was one hotel in Cadenazzo.

== Religion ==
From the 2000 census, 1,298 or 74.0% were Roman Catholic, while 95 or 5.4% belonged to the Swiss Reformed Church. There are 302 individuals (or about 17.21% of the population) who belong to another church (not listed on the census), and 60 individuals (or about 3.42% of the population) did not answer the question.

== Climate ==
Between 1961 and 1990 Cadenazzo had an average of 103 days of rain or snow per year and on average received 1,772 mm (69.8 in) of precipitation. The wettest month was May during which time Magadino received an average of 211 mm (8.3 in) of rain or snow. During this month there was precipitation for an average of 12.9 days. The driest month of the year was December with an average of 67 mm (2.6 in) of precipitation over 5.5 days.

Climate data for Magadino/Cadenazzo(1981-2010)
Month	Jan	Feb	Mar	Apr	May	Jun	Jul	Aug	Sep	Oct	Nov	Dec	Year
Mean daily maximum °C (°F)	6.1 (43.0)	8.6 (47.5)	13.8 (56.8)	16.9 (62.4)	21.2 (70.2)	25.1 (77.2)	27.6 (81.7)	26.7 (80.1)	22.2 (72.0)	16.7 (62.1)	10.8 (51.4)	6.5 (43.7)	16.9 (62.4)
Daily mean °C (°F)	0.9 (33.6)	3.0 (37.4)	7.9 (46.2)	11.5 (52.7)	15.7 (60.3)	19.5 (67.1)	21.7 (71.1)	20.8 (69.4)	16.7 (62.1)	11.6 (52.9)	5.8 (42.4)	1.7 (35.1)	11.4 (52.5)
Mean daily minimum °C (°F)	−3.4 (25.9)	−2.0 (28.4)	1.7 (35.1)	5.5 (41.9)	10.4 (50.7)	13.8 (56.8)	15.8 (60.4)	15.3 (59.5)	11.6 (52.9)	7.0 (44.6)	1.4 (34.5)	−2.5 (27.5)	6.2 (43.2)
Average precipitation mm (inches)	70 (2.8)	59 (2.3)	91 (3.6)	188 (7.4)	227 (8.9)	186 (7.3)	164 (6.5)	178 (7.0)	220 (8.7)	186 (7.3)	173 (6.8)	89 (3.5)	1,832 (72.1)
Average snowfall cm (inches)	14 (5.5)	3.9 (1.5)	0.9 (0.4)	0 (0)	0 (0)	0 (0)	0 (0)	0 (0)	0 (0)	0 (0)	0.2 (0.1)	11.1 (4.4)	30.1 (11.9)
Average precipitation days (≥ 1.0 mm)	4.7	4.3	6.1	10.2	12.6	10.2	8.6	9.7	8.4	9.4	8.0	6.4	98.6
Average snowy days (≥ 1.0 cm)	1.3	1	0.3	0	0	0	0	0	0	0	0.1	1.2	3.9
Average relative humidity (%)	76	70	62	66	70	69	69	72	76	81	78	78	72
Mean monthly sunshine hours	128	139	186	179	191	228	261	243	189	143	111	104	2,102
Source: MeteoSwiss

== Education ==
In Cadenazzo about 55.2% of the population (between age 25 and 64) have completed either non-mandatory upper secondary education or additional higher education (either University or a Fachhochschule).

In Cadenazzo there are a total of 440 students (as of 2009). The Ticino education system provides up to three years of non-mandatory kindergarten and in Cadenazzo there are 62 children in kindergarten.

The primary school program lasts for five years and includes both a standard school and a special school. In the municipality, 137 students attend the standard primary schools and 11 students attend the special school. In the lower secondary school system, students either attend a two-year middle school followed by a two-year pre-apprenticeship or they attend a four-year program to prepare for higher education. There are 119 students in the two-year middle school and 1 in their pre-apprenticeship, while 19 students are in the four-year advanced program.

The upper secondary school includes several options, but at the end of the upper secondary program, a student will be prepared to enter a trade or to continue on to a university or college. In Ticino, vocational students may either attend school while working on their internship or apprenticeship (which takes three or four years) or may attend school followed by an internship or apprenticeship (which takes one year as a full-time student or one and a half to two years as a part-time student).

There are 22 vocational students who are attending school full-time and 67 who attend part-time. The professional program lasts three years and prepares a student for a job in engineering, nursing, computer science, business, tourism and similar fields. There are 2 students in the professional program.

As of 2000, there were 308 students in Cadenazzo who came from another municipality, while 67 residents attended schools outside the municipality.

== Transportation ==
The municipality has a railway station, Cadenazzo. It is located on the Cadenazzo–Luino and Giubiasco–Locarno lines and has regular service to Locarno, Castione-Arbedo, Biasca, Luino, and Gallarate.
