= Sant'Antonino =

- Municipality
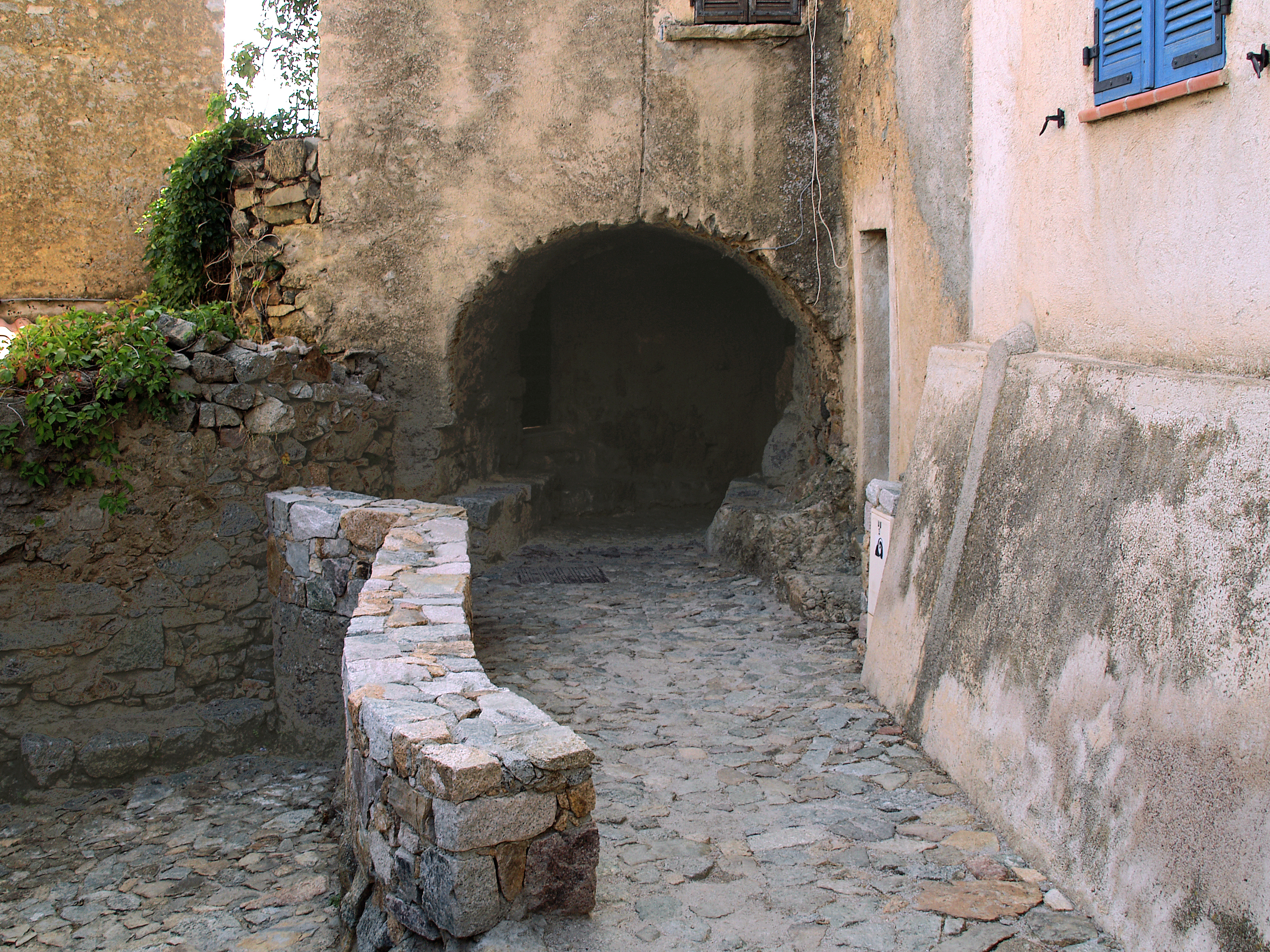
- Sant'Antonino street

- Flag Coat of arms
- Location of Sant'Antonino
- Location within Switzerland Location within Canton of Ticino
- Coordinates: 46°09′N 8°59′E
- Country: Switzerland
- Canton: Ticino
- District: Bellinzona

Government
  - Mayor: Sindaco

Area
  - Total: 6.59 km^{2} (2.54 sq mi)
- Elevation: 226 m (741 ft)

Population (December 2004)
  - Total: 2,211
  - Density: 336/km^{2} (869/sq mi)
- Time zone: UTC+01:00 (CET)
  - Summer (DST): UTC+02:00 (CEST)
- Postal code: 6592
- SFOS number: 5017
- ISO 3166 code: CH-TI
- Surrounded by: Cadenazzo, Camorino, Giubiasco, Gudo, Isone
- Website: santantonino.ch

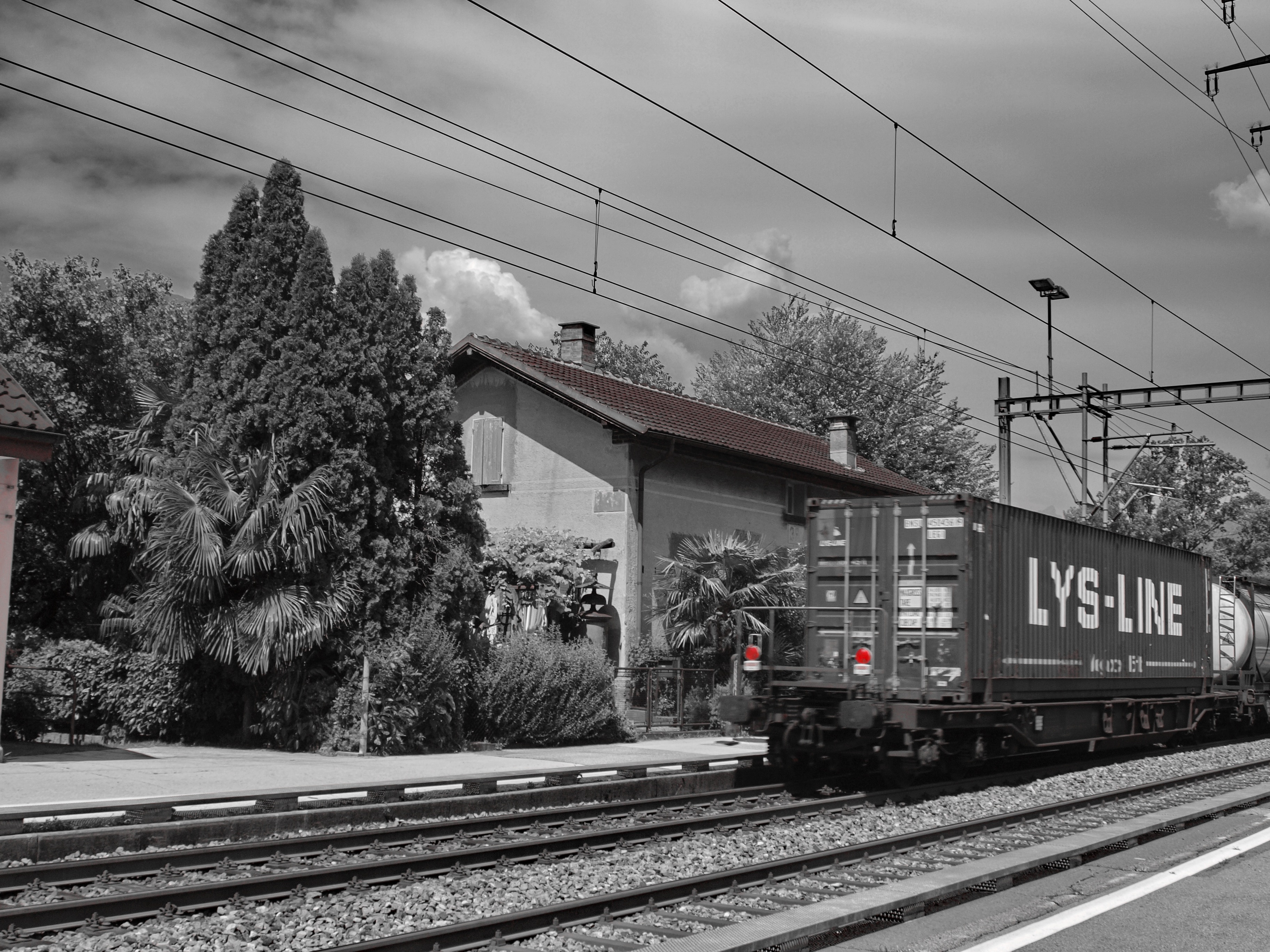
Train passing at Railway Station of S.Antonino

Sant'Antonino is a municipality in the district of Bellinzona in the canton of Ticino in Switzerland.

== History ==
Sant'Antonino is first mentioned in 1219 as Sancto Antorino. In the al Sasso area, some late-Roman graves were discovered. During the Middle Ages, the Church of S. Pietro in Bellinzona (early 13th century), the hospital in Contone (1337) and the cathedral of Como (1397) all owned land in Sant'Antonino. Until 1442, it was part of the Bellinzona parish. Then it formed a parish with Cadenazzo, which remained until it dissolved in 1830. The first church in the village is mentioned in 1291. It was rebuilt in the 16th and 17th centuries, in the Baroque style.

The local economy was dominated by livestock farming and agriculture. By the end of the 19th century, reclamation of land along the Magadino river allowed additional agricultural land. Beginning in the 1960s and 70s, it grew into a residential community, due to it close proximity to Bellinzona. At the beginning of the 21st century, the municipality was home to a growing number of commercial and industrial enterprises.

== Geography ==
Sant'Antonino has an area, as of 1997, of 6.59 square kilometers (2.54 sq mi). Of this area, 2.85 km^{2} (1.10 sq mi) or 43.2% is used for agricultural purposes, while 2.92 km^{2} (1.13 sq mi) or 44.3% is forested. Of the rest of the land, 1.11 km^{2} (0.43 sq mi) or 16.8% is settled (buildings or roads), 0.12 km^{2} (30 acres) or 1.8% is either rivers or lakes and 0.04 km^{2} (9.9 acres) or 0.6% is unproductive land.

Of the built up area, industrial buildings made up 2.7% of the total area while housing and buildings made up 8.3% and transportation infrastructure made up 5.6%. Out of the forested land, 40.7% of the total land area is heavily forested and 2.1% is covered with orchards or small clusters of trees. Of the agricultural land, 29.6% is used for growing crops, while 5.3% is used for orchards or vine crops and 8.3% is used for alpine pastures. Of the water in the municipality, 0.5% is in lakes and 1.4% is in rivers and streams.

The municipality is located in the Bellinzona district, in Magadino river valley along the northern slope of the Monte Ceneri. It consists of the village of Sant'Antonino and the hamlets of Paiardi and Vigana.

== Coat of arms ==
The blazon of the municipal coat of arms is Gules an Eagle displayed Argent holding with both talons a Sword fesswise Argent handled and pommed Or.

== Demographics ==
Sant'Antonino has a population (as of December 2020) of 2,542. As of 2008, 29.7% of the population are foreign nationals. Over the last 10 years (1997–2007) the population has changed at a rate of 8.3%.

Most of the population (as of 2000) speaks Italian (86.7%), with German being second most common (5.6%) and Portuguese being third (2.5%). Of the Swiss national languages (as of 2000), 116 speak German, 11 people speak French, 1,792 people speak Italian, and 5 people speak Romansh. The remainder (142 people) speak another language.

As of 2008, the gender distribution of the population was 51.2% male and 48.8% female. The population was made up of 796 Swiss men (35.2% of the population), and 363 (16.0%) non-Swiss men. There were 819 Swiss women (36.2%), and 284 (12.6%) non-Swiss women.

In 2008 there were 20 live births to Swiss citizens and 5 births to non-Swiss citizens, and in same time span there were 5 deaths of Swiss citizens and 2 non-Swiss citizen deaths. Ignoring immigration and emigration, the population of Swiss citizens increased by 15 while the foreign population increased by 3. There was 1 Swiss man who immigrated back to Switzerland and 1 Swiss woman who emigrated from Switzerland. At the same time, there were 4 non-Swiss men and 10 non-Swiss women who immigrated from another country to Switzerland. The total Swiss population change in 2008 (from all sources) was an increase of 8 and the non-Swiss population change was a decrease of 3 people. This represents a population growth rate of 0.2%.

The age distribution, as of 2009, in Sant'Antonino is; 217 children or 9.6% of the population are between 0 and 9 years old and 265 teenagers or 11.7% are between 10 and 19. Of the adult population, 256 people or 11.3% of the population are between 20 and 29 years old. 343 people or 15.2% are between 30 and 39, 410 people or 18.1% are between 40 and 49, and 275 people or 12.2% are between 50 and 59. The senior population distribution is 292 people or 12.9% of the population are between 60 and 69 years old, 132 people or 5.8% are between 70 and 79, there are 72 people or 3.2% who are over 80.

As of 2000, there were 794 private households in the municipality, and an average of 2.6 persons per household. In 2000 there were 410 single family homes (or 75.4% of the total) out of a total of 544 inhabited buildings. There were 86 two family buildings (15.8%) and 32 multi-family buildings (5.9%). There were also 16 buildings in the municipality that were multipurpose buildings (used for both housing and commercial or another purpose).

The vacancy rate for the municipality, in 2008, was 0.1%. In 2000 there were 912 apartments in the municipality. The most common apartment size was the 4 room apartment of which there were 328. There were 29 single room apartments and 182 apartments with five or more rooms. Of these apartments, a total of 792 apartments (86.8% of the total) were permanently occupied, while 86 apartments (9.4%) were seasonally occupied and 34 apartments (3.7%) were empty. As of 2007, the construction rate of new housing units was 2.2 new units per 1000 residents.

The historical population is given in the following table:

year	population
1591	400
1696	453
1795	373
1850	329
1900	380
1950	440
1960	543
1970	711
1980	1,130
1990	1,711
2000	2,066
2010	2,274

== Politics ==
In the 2007 federal election the most popular party was the FDP which received 37.61% of the vote. The next three most popular parties were the CVP (30.42%), the SP (13.6%) and the Ticino League (8.85%). In the federal election, a total of 552 votes were cast, and the voter turnout was 44.5%.

In the 2007 Gran Consiglio election, there were a total of 1,234 registered voters in Sant'Antonino, of which 877 or 71.1% voted. 7 blank ballots and 1 null ballot were cast, leaving 869 valid ballots in the election. The most popular party was the PLRT which received 318 or 36.6% of the vote. The next three most popular parties were; the PPD+GenGiova (with 200 or 23.0%), the SSI (with 145 or 16.7%) and the PS (with 89 or 10.2%).

In the 2007 Consiglio di Stato election, there were 8 blank ballots and 1 null ballot, which left 868 valid ballots in the election. The most popular party was the PLRT which received 290 or 33.4% of the vote. The next three most popular parties were; the PPD (with 202 or 23.3%), the SSI (with 134 or 15.4%) and the LEGA (with 101 or 11.6%).

== Economy ==
As of 2007, Sant'Antonino had an unemployment rate of 4.59%. As of 2005, there were 90 people employed in the primary economic sector and about 22 businesses involved in this sector. 509 people are employed in the secondary sector and there are 32 businesses in this sector. 1,156 people are employed in the tertiary sector, with 98 businesses in this sector. There were 1,028 residents of the municipality who were employed in some capacity, of which females made up 40.8% of the workforce.

In 2000, there were 951 workers who commuted into the municipality and 706 workers who commuted away. The municipality is a net importer of workers, with about 1.3 workers entering the municipality for every one leaving. About 10.3% of the workforce coming into Sant'Antonino are coming from outside Switzerland, while 0.1% of the locals commute out of Switzerland for work. Of the working population, 6.4% used public transportation to get to work, and 68.1% used a private car.

As of 2009, there was one hotel in Sant'Antonino.

== Religion ==
From the 2000 census, 1,679 or 81.3% were Roman Catholic, while 119 or 5.8% belonged to the Swiss Reformed Church. There are 177 individuals (or about 8.57% of the population) who belong to another church (not listed on the census), and 91 individuals (or about 4.40% of the population) did not answer the question.

== Education ==
In Sant'Antonino about 57.9% of the population (between age 25–64) have completed either non-mandatory upper secondary education or additional higher education (either university or a Fachhochschule).

In Sant'Antonino there are a total of 406 students (as of 2009). The Ticino education system provides up to three years of non-mandatory kindergarten and in Sant'Antonino there are 64 children in kindergarten. The primary school program lasts for five years and includes both a standard school and a special school. In the municipality, 129 students attend the standard primary schools and 6 students attend the special school. In the lower secondary school system, students either attend a two-year middle school followed by a two-year pre-apprenticeship or they attend a four-year program to prepare for higher education. There are 96 students in the two-year middle school and 1 in their pre-apprenticeship, while 31 students are in the four-year advanced program.

The upper secondary school includes several options, but at the end of the upper secondary program, a student will be prepared to enter a trade or to continue on to a university or college. In Ticino, vocational students may either attend school while working on their internship or apprenticeship (which takes three or four years) or may attend school followed by an internship or apprenticeship (which takes one year as a full-time student or one and a half to two years as a part-time student). There are 19 vocational students who are attending school full-time and 54 who attend part-time.

The professional program lasts three years and prepares a student for a job in engineering, nursing, computer science, business, tourism and similar fields. There are 6 students in the professional program.

As of 2000, there were 3 students in Sant'Antonino who came from another municipality, while 191 residents attended schools outside the municipality.

== Transportation ==
The municipality has a railway station, Sant'Antonino, on the Giubiasco–Locarno line.
