= Isone =

- Municipality
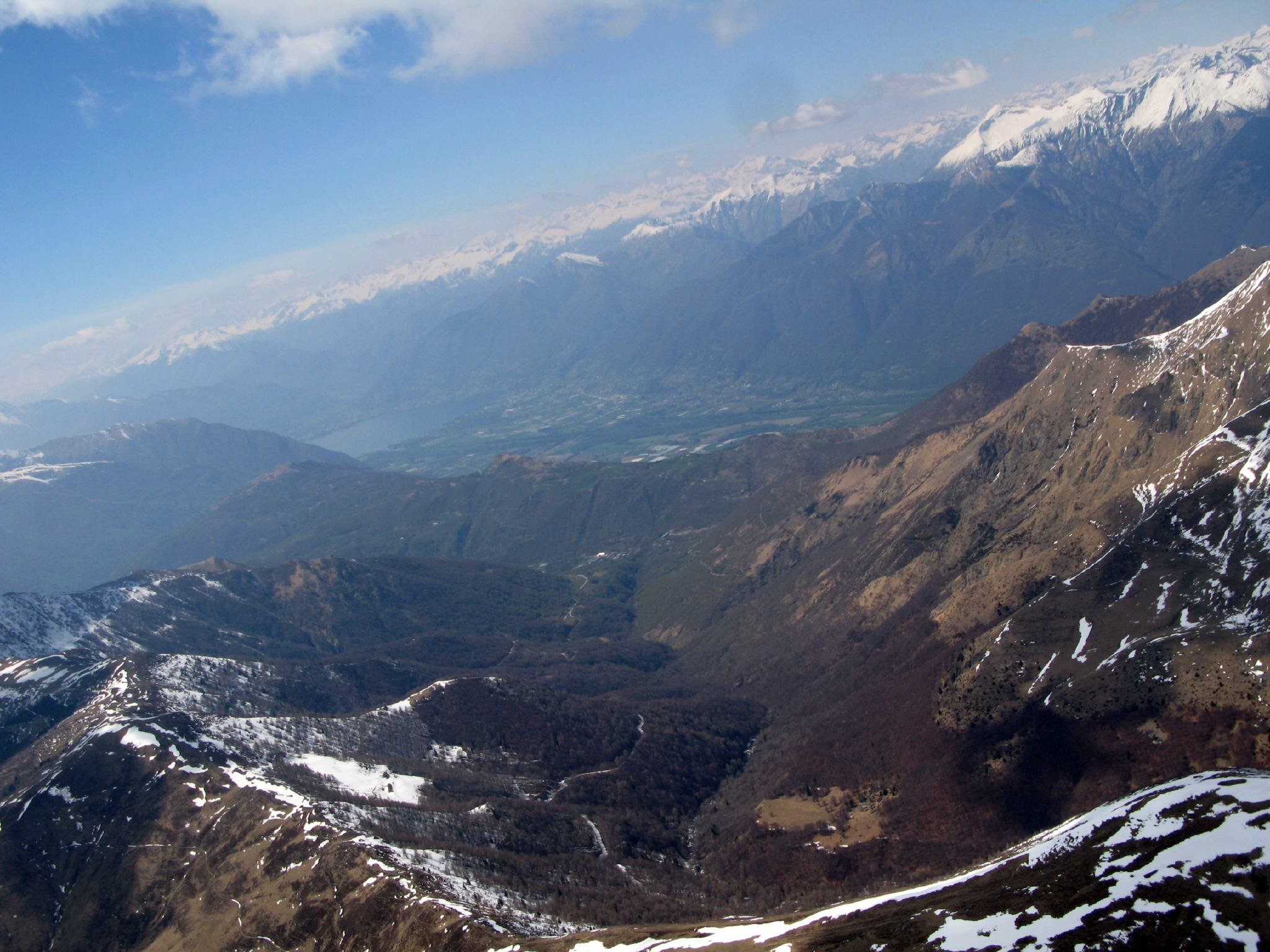

- Flag Coat of arms
- Location of Isone
- Location within Switzerland Location within Canton of Ticino
- Coordinates: 46°8′N 8°59′E
- Country: Switzerland
- Canton: Ticino
- District: Bellinzona

Government
  - Mayor: Sindaco

Area
  - Total: 12.82 km^{2} (4.95 sq mi)
- Elevation: 748 m (2,454 ft)

Population (December 2004)
  - Total: 364
  - Density: 28.4/km^{2} (73.5/sq mi)
- Time zone: UTC+01:00 (CET)
  - Summer (DST): UTC+02:00 (CEST)
- Postal code: 6810
- SFOS number: 5009
- ISO 3166 code: CH-TI
- Surrounded by: Cadenazzo, Camorino, Capriasca, Medeglia, Pianezzo, Ponte Capriasca, Sant'Antonino
- Website: http://www.isone.ch/

Isone is a municipality in the district of Bellinzona in the canton of Ticino in Switzerland.

Isone is mainly known for being the location of the grenadier school (Grenadierschule) of the Swiss Army. The Grenadiers are a division of the infantry corps, and have been trained in Isone since 1970. Prior to 1970, training had taken place in Losone.

== Geography ==
Aerial view (1946)

Isone has an area, as of 1997, of 12.82 square kilometers (4.95 sq mi). Of this area, 0.55 km^{2} (0.21 sq mi) or 4.3% is used for agricultural purposes, while 8.3 km^{2} (3.2 sq mi) or 64.7% is forested. Of the rest of the land, 0.27 km^{2} (0.10 sq mi) or 2.1% is settled (buildings or roads), 0.07 km^{2} (17 acres) or 0.5% is either rivers or lakes and 1.36 km^{2} (0.53 sq mi) or 10.6% is unproductive land.

Of the built up area, housing and buildings made up 0.9% and transportation infrastructure made up 1.0%. Out of the forested land, 53.2% of the total land area is heavily forested and 4.8% is covered with orchards or small clusters of trees. Of the agricultural land, 3.4% is used for growing crops. All the water in the municipality is flowing water. Of the unproductive areas, 9.4% is unproductive vegetation and 1.2% is too rocky for vegetation.

The municipality is located in the Bellinzona district, in the upper Vedeggio Valley.

== Coat of arms ==
The blazon of the municipal coat of arms is Vert St. Lawrence issuant from base haloed Or clead Gules and vested Argent holding in his dexter hand a gril and in his sinister a palm leaf both also Or. Saint Lawrence is the patron saint of this municipality."

== Demographics ==
Isone has a population (as of December 2020) of 395. As of 2008, 8.0% of the population are foreign nationals. Over the last 10 years (1997–2007) the population has changed at a rate of -7.7%.

Most of the population (as of 2000) speaks Italian (89.2%), with Serbo-Croatian being second most common (4.2%) and German being third (2.3%). Of the Swiss national languages (as of 2000), 8 speak German, 7 people speak French, 315 people speak Italian, The remainder (23 people) speak another language.

As of 2008, the gender distribution of the population was 55.0% male and 45.0% female. The population was made up of 189 Swiss men (50.0% of the population), and 19 (5.0%) non-Swiss men. There were 153 Swiss women (40.5%), and 17 (4.5%) non-Swiss women. In 2008 there were 3 live births to Swiss citizens, and in same time span there were 5 deaths of Swiss citizens. Ignoring immigration and emigration, the population of Swiss citizens decreased by 2 while the foreign population remained the same. There was 1 Swiss woman who emigrated from Switzerland. At the same time, there was 1 non-Swiss woman who emigrated from Switzerland to another country. The total Swiss population change in 2008 (from all sources) was an increase of 8 and the non-Swiss population change was a decrease of 3 people. This represents a population growth rate of 1.3%.

The age distribution, as of 2009, in Isone is; 28 children or 7.4% of the population are between 0 and 9 years old and 24 teenagers or 6.3% are between 10 and 19. Of the adult population, 45 people or 11.9% of the population are between 20 and 29 years old. 50 people or 13.2% are between 30 and 39, 54 people or 14.3% are between 40 and 49, and 57 people or 15.1% are between 50 and 59. The senior population distribution is 63 people or 16.7% of the population are between 60 and 69 years old, 31 people or 8.2% are between 70 and 79, there are 26 people or 6.9% who are over 80.

As of 2000, there were 147 private households in the municipality, and an average of 2.4 persons per household. In 2000 there were 168 single family homes (or 86.6% of the total) out of a total of 194 inhabited buildings. There were 19 two family buildings (9.8%) and 1 multi-family buildings (.5%). There were also 6 buildings in the municipality that were multipurpose buildings (used for both housing and commercial or another purpose).

The vacancy rate for the municipality, in 2008, was 0%. In 2000 there were 211 apartments in the municipality. The most common apartment size was the 4 room apartment of which there were 68. There were 11 single room apartments and 49 apartments with five or more rooms. Of these apartments, a total of 140 apartments (66.4% of the total) were permanently occupied, while 70 apartments (33.2%) were seasonally occupied and 1 apartments (.5%) were empty. As of 2007, the construction rate of new housing units was 0 new units per 1000 residents.

The historical population is given in the following table:

year	population
1591	440
1709	617
1801	608
1850	789
1900	750
1950	682
1980	371
1990	383
2000	353

== Politics ==
In the 2007 federal election the most popular party was the CVP which received 57.92% of the vote. The next three most popular parties were the FDP (14.39%), the SVP (13.11%) and the Ticino League (10.26%). In the federal election, a total of 222 votes were cast, and the voter turnout was 70.9%.

In the 2007 Gran Consiglio election, there were a total of 314 registered voters in Isone, of which 256 or 81.5% voted. 2 blank ballots and 1 null ballot were cast, leaving 253 valid ballots in the election. The most popular party was the PPD+GenGiova which received 134 or 53.0% of the vote. The next three most popular parties were; the PLRT (with 49 or 19.4%), the LEGA (with 24 or 9.5%) and the SSI (with 18 or 7.1%).

In the 2007 Consiglio di Stato election, there were 3 blank ballots and 1 null ballot, which left 252 valid ballots in the election. The most popular party was the PPD which received 127 or 50.4% of the vote. The next three most popular parties were; the LEGA (with 42 or 16.7%), the PLRT (with 36 or 14.3%) and the SSI (with 22 or 8.7%).

== Economy ==
As of 2007, Isone had an unemployment rate of 1.12%. As of 2005, there were 17 people employed in the primary economic sector and about 7 businesses involved in this sector. 49 people are employed in the secondary sector and there are 2 businesses in this sector. 58 people are employed in the tertiary sector, with 9 businesses in this sector.

There were 159 residents of the municipality who were employed in some capacity, of which females made up 34.0% of the workforce. In 2000, there were 114 workers who commuted into the municipality and 96 workers who commuted away. The municipality is a net importer of workers, with about 1.2 workers entering the municipality for every one leaving. About 35.1% of the workforce coming into Isone are coming from outside Switzerland. Of the working population, 9.4% used public transportation to get to work, and 62.3% used a private car.

As of 2009, there were 2 hotels in Isone.

== Religion ==
From the 2000 census, 304 or 86.1% were Roman Catholic, while 9 or 2.5% belonged to the Swiss Reformed Church. There are 25 individuals (or about 7.08% of the population) who belong to another church (not listed on the census), and 15 individuals (or about 4.25% of the population) did not answer the question.

== Education ==
The entire Swiss population is generally well educated. In Isone about 56.6% of the population (between age 25–64) have completed either non-mandatory upper secondary education or additional higher education (either university or a Fachhochschule).

In Isone there are a total of 45 students (as of 2009). The Ticino education system provides up to three years of non-mandatory kindergarten and in Isone there are 6 children in kindergarten. The primary school program lasts for five years and includes both a standard school and a special school. In the municipality, 16 students attend the standard primary schools and 1 students attend the special school. In the lower secondary school system, students either attend a two-year middle school followed by a two-year pre-apprenticeship or they attend a four-year program to prepare for higher education. There are 12 students in the two-year middle school and in their pre-apprenticeship, while 3 students are in the four-year advanced program.

The upper secondary school includes several options, but at the end of the upper secondary program, a student will be prepared to enter a trade or to continue on to a university or college. In Ticino, vocational students may either attend school while working on their internship or apprenticeship (which takes three or four years) or may attend school followed by an internship or apprenticeship (which takes one year as a full-time student or one and a half to two years as a part-time student). There are 3 vocational students who are attending school full-time and 4 who attend part-time.

As of 2000, there were 11 students in Isone who came from another municipality, while 42 residents attended schools outside the municipality.
