= Giuseppa Caterina Totti =

Swiss Benedictine abbess

- Born: Giuseppa Agostina Totti c. 1748; Biasca
- Died: 22 June 1824
- Occupation: Abbess

Giuseppa Caterina Totti (born Giuseppa Agostina Totti; c. 1748 – 22 June 1824) was a Swiss Benedictine nun and abbess of the monastery of Maria Assunta delle benedettine at Claro. She became known as the "mother of the poor" for her charitable spirit and her resistance to Helvetic Directorate authority during the turbulent period of the Helvetic Republic.

== Life ==
Giuseppa Agostina Totti was the only daughter of Lieutenant Carlo Giuseppe Totti, from Biasca, and Margherita Cattani, from Giornico. She took her vows in 1764, receiving the religious name Giuseppa Caterina, and subsequently served multiple terms as abbess of the Benedictine monastery of Notre-Dame-de-l'Assomption at Claro (1790–1793, 1795–1803, 1809–1824). In 1798, the Curia of Milan, wishing to avoid an election given the difficult political situation, confirmed her in her position.

During the Helvetic Republic and the passage of French and Russian troops, she was compelled by the Helvetic Directorate to accept a lay administrator and to dismiss the novices. She showed considerable strength of character by opposing the occupation of the monastery and contesting the orders of the Directorate. Her charitable spirit earned her the title of "mother of the poor," and she never departed from the rules of monastic life.

== Bibliography ==
- Moretti, Antonietta: "Claro", in: Helvetia Sacra, III/1, 1986, pp. 1679–1712.
- Vaccaro, Luciano; Chiesi, Giuseppe; Panzera, Fabrizio (eds.): Terre del Ticino. Diocesi di Lugano, 2003, pp. 253–254.
- Nicoli, Miriam; Cleis, Franca: La Gran Regina del Cielo e le Benedettine di Claro. Genealogia femminile di un Sacro Monte in area alpina nel manoscritto di suor Ippolita Orelli (1697), 2021, p. 83.
