= Bellinzona District =

Coordinates: 46°12′N 9°01′E

Bellinzona District Distretto di Bellinzona
- District
- Country: Switzerland
- Canton: Ticino
- Capital: Bellinzona

Area
  - Total: 205.68 km^{2} (79.41 sq mi)

Population (2020)
  - Total: 55,906
  - Density: 271.81/km^{2} (703.99/sq mi)
- Time zone: UTC+1 (CET)
  - Summer (DST): UTC+2 (CEST)
- Municipalities: 6

The district of Bellinzona (Italian: Distretto di Bellinzona, also called Bellinzonese) is a district of Canton Ticino, Switzerland. It has a population of 55,906 (as of 31 December 2020).

== Geography ==
The district has an area, (based on the 2004/09/16 survey) of 205.68 km^{2} (79.41 sq mi). Of this area, 27.98 km^{2} (10.80 sq mi) or 13.2% is used for agricultural purposes, while 145.46 km^{2} (56.16 sq mi) or 68.7% is forested. Of the rest of the land, 17.51 km^{2} (6.76 sq mi) or 8.3% is settled (buildings or roads), 3.27 km^{2} (1.26 sq mi) or 1.5% is either rivers or lakes and 15.4 km^{2} (5.9 sq mi) or 7.3% is unproductive land.

Of the built up area, housing and buildings made up 4.0% and transportation infrastructure made up 2.5%. Out of the forested land, 59.7% of the total land area is heavily forested and 2.2% is covered with orchards or small clusters of trees. Of the agricultural land, 7.5% is used for growing crops, while 1.7% is used for orchards or vine crops and 4.0% is used for alpine pastures. All the water in the district is flowing water. Of the unproductive areas, 5.2% is unproductive vegetation and 2.1% is too rocky for vegetation.

== Demographics ==
Of the Swiss national languages (as of 2000), 1,843 speak German, 492 people speak French, 38,109 people speak Italian, and 42 people speak Romansh. The remainder (2,912 people) speak another language.

As of 2008, the gender distribution of the population was 48.3% male and 51.7% female. The population was made up of 16,770 Swiss men (34.6% of the population), and 6,606 (13.6%) non-Swiss men. There were 19,192 Swiss women (39.6%), and 5,838 (12.1%) non-Swiss women.

In 2008 there were 364 live births to Swiss citizens and 98 births to non-Swiss citizens, and in same time span there were 329 deaths of Swiss citizens and 51 non-Swiss citizen deaths. Ignoring immigration and emigration, the population of Swiss citizens increased by 35 while the foreign population increased by 47. There were 6 Swiss men and 4 Swiss women who emigrated from Switzerland. At the same time, there were 188 non-Swiss men and 157 non-Swiss women who immigrated from another country to Switzerland. The total Swiss population change in 2008 (from all sources) was an increase of 749 and the non-Swiss population change was a decrease of 91 people. This represents a population growth rate of 1.4%.

The age distribution, as of 2009, in the district is; 4,644 children or 9.6% of the population are between 0 and 9 years old and 4,796 teenagers or 9.9% are between 10 and 19. Of the adult population, 5,627 people or 11.6% of the population are between 20 and 29 years old. 7,097 people or 14.7% are between 30 and 39, 8,137 people or 16.8% are between 40 and 49, and 6,291 people or 13.0% are between 50 and 59. The senior population distribution is 5,541 people or 11.4% of the population are between 60 and 69 years old, 3,732 people or 7.7% are between 70 and 79, there are 2,541 people or 5.2% who are over 80.

In 2000 there were 15,519 single family homes (or 45.9% of the total) out of a total of 33,816 inhabited buildings. There were 4,707 two family buildings (13.9%) and 10,816 multi-family buildings (32.0%). There were also 2,774 buildings in the district that were multipurpose buildings (used for both housing and commercial or another purpose). In 2000 there were 22,466 apartments in the district. The most common apartment size was the 4 room apartment of which there were 7,594. There were 1,109 single room apartments and 4,040 apartments with five or more rooms. Of these apartments, a total of 18,452 apartments (82.1% of the total) were permanently occupied, while 3,421 apartments (15.2%) were seasonally occupied and 593 apartments (2.6%) were empty.

The historical population is given in the following table:

year	population
1850	11,582
1880	13,597
1900	17,742
1950	24,083
1960	26,681
1980	37,956
1990	40,618
2000	43,398

== Politics ==
In the 2007 federal election the most popular party was the FDP which received 32.78% of the vote. The next three most popular parties were the CVP (22.94%), the SP (20.19%) and the Ticino League (11.12%). In the federal election, a total of 13,901 votes were cast, and the voter turnout was 48.7%.

In the 2007 Ticino Gran Consiglio election, there were a total of 28,519 registered voters in the district, of which 19,508 or 68.4% voted. 310 blank ballots and 37 null ballots were cast, leaving 19,161 valid ballots in the election. The most popular party was the PLRT which received 5,371 or 28.0% of the vote. The next three most popular parties were; the SSI (with 3,541 or 18.5%), the PPD+GenGiova (with 3,405 or 17.8%) and the PS (with 3,193 or 16.7%).

In the 2007 Ticino Consiglio di Stato election, 209 blank ballots and 56 null ballots were cast, leaving 19,247 valid ballots in the election. The most popular party was the PLRT which received 4,975 or 25.8% of the vote. The next three most popular parties were; the PS (with 3,799 or 19.7%), the PPD (with 3,459 or 18.0%) and the SSI (with 3,162 or 16.4%).

== Religion ==
From the 2000 census, 33,661 or 77.6% were Roman Catholic, while 1,908 or 4.4% belonged to the Swiss Reformed Church. There are 5,346 individuals (or about 12.32% of the population) who belong to another church (not listed on the census), and 2,483 individuals (or about 5.72% of the population) did not answer the question.

== Education ==
The district had a total of 7,949 students (as of 2009). The Ticino education system provides up to three years of non-mandatory kindergarten and there were 1,296 children in kindergarten. The primary school program lasts for five years and includes both a standard school and a special school. In the district, 2,357 students attended the standard primary schools and 153 students attended the special school. In the lower secondary school system, students either attend a two-year middle school followed by a two-year pre-apprenticeship or they attend a four-year program to prepare for higher education. There were 1,911 students in the two-year middle school and 11 in their pre-apprenticeship, while 749 students were in the four-year advanced program.

The upper secondary school includes several options, but at the end of the upper secondary program, a student will be prepared to enter a trade or to continue on to a university or college. In Ticino, vocational students may either attend school while working on their internship or apprenticeship (which takes three or four years) or may attend school followed by an internship or apprenticeship (which takes one year as a full-time student or one and a half to two years as a part-time student). There were 438 vocational students who were attending school full-time and 905 who attend part-time.

The professional program lasts three years and prepares a student for a job in engineering, nursing, computer science, business, tourism and similar fields. There were 129 students in the professional program.

== Circles and municipalities ==
Circolo di Bellinzona
Coat of arms	Municipality	Population (31 December 2020)	Area km^{2}
Bellinzona	Bellinzona	43,360	164.96
	Total	43,360	164.96

Circolo di Arbedo-Castione
Coat of arms	Municipality	Population (31 December 2020)	Area km^{2}
Arbedo-Castione	Arbedo-Castione	5,024	21.28
Lumino	Lumino	1,587	9.95
	Total	6,611	31.23

Circolo di Sant'Antonino
Coat of arms	Municipality	Population (31 December 2020)	Area km^{2}
Sant'Antonino	Sant'Antonino	2,542	6.59
Cadenazzo	Cadenazzo	2,998	8.37
Isone	Isone	395	12.82
	Total	5,935	27.78
