= List of cultural property of national significance in Switzerland: Ticino =

This list contains all cultural property of national significance (class A) in the canton of Ticino from the 2009 Swiss Inventory of Cultural Property of National and Regional Significance. It is sorted by municipality and contains 150 individual buildings, 26 collections and 35 archaeological finds.

The geographic coordinates provided are in the Swiss coordinate system as given in the Inventory.

== Acquarossa ==
KGS No.^{?}	Picture	Name	Street Address	CH1903 X coordinate	CH1903 Y coordinate	Location
10549	Heathens house in Boscone	Heathens house in Boscone	Dongio	716.950	144.110	46.438124°N 8.960468°E
5690	Church of Saint Charles in Negrentino	Church of Saint Charles in Negrentino	Prugiasco	714.010	146.790	46.462734°N 8.92288°E
5432		Church of Saint Remigius	Corzoneso	715.957	144.144	46.438602°N 8.947558°E
5527	Pretorio's Palace (House of Landfogti)	Pretorio's Palace (House of Landfogti)	Lottigna	715.584	147.571	46.469489°N 8.943561°E
10532		Ruins of monastery in Monastero	Corzoneso	716.450	143.600	46.433624°N 8.953835°E
3908	ISOS Village: Dongio	ISOS Village: Dongio				
4067		ISOS Village: Ponto Valentino				
3955	ISOS Hamlet: Largario	ISOS Hamlet: Largario				

== Airolo ==
KGS No.^{?}	Picture	Name	Street Address	CH1903 X coordinate	CH1903 Y coordinate	Location
9056	Hospice Complex on the St. Gotthard Pass with old station, house and barn	Hospice Complex on the St. Gotthard Pass with old station, house and barn		686.510	156.621	46.555275°N 8.566768°E
5226	Forte Airolo	Forte Airolo		688.272	153.655	46.528367°N 8.589175°E
9079	Forte Foppa	Forte Foppa		688.219	153.793	46.529615°N 8.58851°E
10517		Prehistoric Settlement and Roman Necropolis of Madrano		691.280	153.450	46.52612°N 8.628335°E
10516		Prehistoric Settlement on the St. Gotthard Pass (Alpe di Rodont)		685.700	158.600	46.57318°N 8.556574°E
Unknown		ISOS borgo: Airolo				
Unknown		ISOS villaggio: Fontana				

== Alto Malcantone ==
KGS No.^{?}	Picture	Name	Street Address	CH1903 X coordinate	CH1903 Y coordinate	Location
5242	Parish Church of Di S. Michele	Parish Church of Di S. Michele	Arosio	713.131	100.643	46.047838°N 8.90025°E
Unknown		ISOS villaggio: Breno				

== Aranno ==
KGS No.^{?}	Picture	Name	Street Address	CH1903 X coordinate	CH1903 Y coordinate	Location
Unknown		ISOS villaggio: Aranno				

== Arbedo-Castione ==
KGS No.^{?}	Picture	Name	Street Address	CH1903 X coordinate	CH1903 Y coordinate	Location
5238	Church of S. Paolo detta Chiesa Rossa	Church of S. Paolo detta Chiesa Rossa	Via Del Carmagnola	723.529	118.431	46.205995°N 9.039239°E

== Arogno ==
KGS No.^{?}	Picture	Name	Street Address	CH1903 X coordinate	CH1903 Y coordinate	Location
5240	Parish Church of S. Stefano	Parish Church of S. Stefano	Via Alla Church	720.174	090.954	45.959482°N 8.988747°E
Unknown		ISOS villaggio: Arogno				

== Ascona ==
KGS No.^{?}	Picture	Name	Street Address	CH1903 X coordinate	CH1903 Y coordinate	Location
10262; 8634	Albergo Park, Houses and Monte Verità Museum	Albergo; Park, Houses and Monte Verità Museum	Pvia Collina 78–84	702.290	112.759	46.158541°N 8.762858°E
5248	Serodine House	Serodine House	piazzetta San Pietro 4	702.680	112.343	46.15474°N 8.767815°E
9135		Unifamiliare Tuia House	sentiero Roccolo 11	702.671	112.850	46.159301°N 8.767809°E
5250	Church of S. Maria della Misericordia and the Collegio Papio	Church of S. Maria della Misericordia and the Collegio Papio	via delle Cappelle 1	702.915	112.395	46.155172°N 8.770867°E
5253	Church of S. Michele with the ruins of a medieval castle	Church of S. Michele with the ruins of a medieval castle		702.355	112.235	46.153818°N 8.763585°E
5249	Parish Church of Ss. Pietro e Paolo	Parish Church of Ss. Pietro e Paolo		702.677	112.370	46.154983°N 8.767782°E
5251		Balladrum, Prehistoric and Medieval Settlement		701.260	112.500	46.156367°N 8.74947°E
8640	Museo comunale d’arte	Museo comunale d’arte	via Borgo 34	702.630	112.449	46.155701°N 8.767191°E
8628	Museo Epper	Museo Epper	via Albarelle 14	703.112	111.922	46.150887°N 8.773313°E
9389	Teatro S. Materno	Teatro S. Materno	via Losone 3	703.126	113.073	46.161238°N 8.773748°E
9136		Villa	via Ludwig 26	701.053	112.076	46.152584°N 8.7467°E
Unknown		ISOS borgo: Ascona				

== Astano ==
KGS No.^{?}	Picture	Name	Street Address	CH1903 X coordinate	CH1903 Y coordinate	Location
Unknown		ISOS villaggio: Astano				

== Avegno Gordevio ==
KGS No.^{?}	Picture	Name	Street Address	CH1903 X coordinate	CH1903 Y coordinate	Location
Unknown		ISOS villaggio: Avegno Church e di dentro				
Unknown		ISOS villaggio: Avegno di fuori				

== Balerna ==
KGS No.^{?}	Picture	Name	Street Address	CH1903 X coordinate	CH1903 Y coordinate	Location
5261	Collegiate church complex of S. Vittore	Collegiate church complex of S. Vittore	Via Carlo Silva	721.902	078.778	45.849669°N 9.007891°E
10265	Magazzini Generali	Magazzini Generali	via Magazzini Generali	722.371	078.521	45.847273°N 9.013861°E
5262	Ruins of the Medieval Castle at Pontegana	Ruins of the Medieval Castle at Pontegana		722.530	078.050	45.843009°N 9.015785°E

== Bedigliora ==
KGS No.^{?}	Picture	Name	Street Address	CH1903 X coordinate	CH1903 Y coordinate	Location
Unknown		ISOS villaggio: Bedigliora				

== Bedretto ==
KGS No.^{?}	Picture	Name	Street Address	CH1903 X coordinate	CH1903 Y coordinate	Location
Unknown		ISOS villaggio: Bedretto				
Unknown		ISOS villaggio: Villa				

== Bellinzona ==
KGS No.^{?}	Picture	Name	Street Address	CH1903 X coordinate	CH1903 Y coordinate	Location
8974; 10528; 8565	Archivio Di Stato Del Cantone Ticino	Archivio Di Stato Del Cantone Ticino	Collezione Etnografica Dello Stato E Collezione	721.549	116.929	46.192846°N 9.0132°E
9029	Bagno Pubblico	Bagno Pubblico	via Mirasole 20	721.862	117.563	46.198492°N 9.017419°E
5270; 11786	Castel Grande e Museo con collezioni archeologiche	Castel Grande e Museo con collezioni archeologiche		722.275	116.987	46.193237°N 9.022617°E
9681	Castelli e città (medioevo / epoca moderna)	Castelli e città (medioevo / epoca moderna)		722.350	116.900	46.19244°N 9.023566°E
5271; 11787	Castello di Montebello e Museo Civico	Castello di Montebello e Museo Civico	via Artore 4	722.599	116.771	46.191235°N 9.026756°E
5272	Castello di Sasso Corbaro	Castello di Sasso Corbaro	via Sasso Corbaro 44	722.805	116.435	46.188176°N 9.029336°E
5275	Church di S. Maria delle Grazie e convento	Church di S. Maria delle Grazie e convento	via Convento	722.000	116.135	46.185624°N 9.018833°E
5274	Church parrocchiale di S. Biagio a Ravecchia	Church parrocchiale di S. Biagio a Ravecchia		722.181	116.125	46.185501°N 9.021174°E
5276	Collegiata dei Ss. Pietro e Stefano	Collegiata dei Ss. Pietro e Stefano	piazza Collegiata	722.376	116.815	46.191671°N 9.02388°E
10266	Murata e fortificazioni Scuola media	Murata e fortificazioni Scuola media	via Lavizzari 28	721.821	116.945	46.192941°N 9.016726°E
9395	Scuola media	Scuola media	via Lavizzari 28	722.061	117.379	46.196801°N 9.019948°E
5278	Teatro sociale	Teatro sociale	piazza Governo 11	722.169	116.729	46.190935°N 9.021177°E
10453	Fortifications of 18th century, known as «Fortini Della Fame»	Fortifications of 18th century, known as «Fortini Della Fame»	Camorino	721.914	113.819	46.16481°N 9.017116°E
5618	Fortificazioni ottocentesche (dette «Fortini della Fame») and Chiesa della SS. Trinità	Fortificazioni ottocentesche (dette «Fortini della Fame») and Chiesa della SS. Trinità	Monte Carasso	719.913	116.334	46.187788°N 8.99186°E
10534		Necropolis A Progero	Gudo	716.000	114.350	46.17063°N 8.940696°E
10537		Fortificazioni Ottocentesche (Dette «Fortini Della Fame»)	Sementina	720.500	115.425	46.179508°N 8.999227°E
5617	Church of S. Bernardo	Church of S. Bernardo	Monte Carasso	719.570	117.006	46.193893°N 8.98759°E
5717		Antica Miniera A Carena	Sant'Antonio	728.460	114.040	46.165581°N 9.101906°E
Unknown		Medieval Settlement of S. Defendente	Sementina	719.913	116.334	46.187788°N 8.99186°E
Unknown	UNESCO World Heritage Site: Three Castles, Defensive Wall and Ramparts of the Market-Town of Bellinzona	UNESCO World Heritage Site: Three Castles, Defensive Wall and Ramparts of the Market-Town of Bellinzona		722.169	116.729	46.190935°N 9.021177°E
Unknown		ISOS città: Bellinzona				
Unknown		ISOS villaggio: Moleno				
Unknown		ISOS villaggio: Preonzo				

== Biasca ==
KGS No.^{?}	Picture	Name	Street Address	CH1903 X coordinate	CH1903 Y coordinate	Location
9096		Arsenale	Via Ai Grotti 28	718.138	136.026	46.365209°N 8.973865°E
5302	Church prepositurale dei SS. Pietro e Paolo	Church prepositurale dei SS. Pietro e Paolo		718.126	135.413	46.359698°N 8.973553°E
Unknown		ISOS borgo: Biasca				
Unknown		ISOS villaggio: Pontirone				

== Bioggio ==
KGS No.^{?}	Picture	Name	Street Address	CH1903 X coordinate	CH1903 Y coordinate	Location
10518	Roman Cult Site and Old Church of S. Maurizio	Roman Cult Site and Old Church of S. Maurizio	Via Alla Church	713.650	096.850	46.013637°N 8.906038°E
Unknown		ISOS villaggio: Iseo				

== Bissone ==
KGS No.^{?}	Picture	Name	Street Address	CH1903 X coordinate	CH1903 Y coordinate	Location
5321	Parish Church of S. Carpoforo	Parish Church of S. Carpoforo	Via Maroggia	718.455	089.754	45.948993°N 8.966279°E
Unknown		ISOS villaggio: Bissone				

== Blenio ==
KGS No.^{?}	Picture	Name	Street Address	CH1903 X coordinate	CH1903 Y coordinate	Location
5650	Parish Church of S. Martino	Parish Church of S. Martino	Olivone	715.284	154.257	46.529674°N 8.941323°E
Unknown		ISOS villaggio: Dangio				
Unknown	ISOS villaggio: Olivone Chiesa-Solario	ISOS villaggio: Olivone Chiesa-Solario				

== Bodio ==
KGS No.^{?}	Picture	Name	Street Address	CH1903 X coordinate	CH1903 Y coordinate	Location
10269	Centrale Idroelettrica Della Biaschina Hydroelectric Power Plant at Biaschina	Centrale Idroelettrica Della Biaschina; Hydroelectric Power Plant at Biaschina		712.322	137.628	46.380616°N 8.89869°E

== Bosco/Gurin ==
KGS No.^{?}	Picture	Name	Street Address	CH1903 X coordinate	CH1903 Y coordinate	Location
8564	Walserhaus Walser Style House	Walserhaus; Walser Style House		680.976	130.078	46.317219°N 8.489974°E
Unknown		ISOS villaggio: Bosco/Gurin				

== Breggia ==
KGS No.^{?}	Picture	Name	Street Address	CH1903 X coordinate	CH1903 Y coordinate	Location
5350		Cantoni House	Cabbio	724.768	084.254	45.898395°N 9.046218°E
10291		Nevèra	Muggio, alpe Genor	723.058	086.695	45.920661°N 9.024827°E
Unknown		ISOS villaggio: Cabbio				
Unknown		ISOS villaggio: Muggio				
Unknown		ISOS villaggio: Scudellate				

== Brissago ==
KGS No.^{?}	Picture	Name	Street Address	CH1903 X coordinate	CH1903 Y coordinate	Location
5339; 8625	Baccalà E Museo Leoncavallo House	Baccalà E Museo Leoncavallo House	Vicolo Al Castello	698.403	108.333	46.119311°N 8.711618°E
5340	Church of Madonna del Ponte	Church of Madonna del Ponte	via Valmara	697.926	107.512	46.111996°N 8.705277°E
5341	Church of Santuario di S. Maria Addolorata del Sacro Monte	Church of Santuario di S. Maria Addolorata del Sacro Monte		697.944	108.530	46.121149°N 8.705722°E
5342; 10519	Isole, Botanical Garden and Cult Site	Isole, Botanical Garden and Cult Site	con Via Crucis, gradinata del Calvario	700.250	109.850	46.132683°N 8.735831°E
Unknown		ISOS caso particolare: Isole di Brissago				

== Brusino Arsizio ==
KGS No.^{?}	Picture	Name	Street Address	CH1903 X coordinate	CH1903 Y coordinate	Location
Unknown		ISOS villaggio: Brusino Arsizio				

== Cademario ==
KGS No.^{?}	Picture	Name	Street Address	CH1903 X coordinate	CH1903 Y coordinate	Location
5353; 8659	Parish Church of S. Ambrogio	Parish Church of S. Ambrogio	Strada Della Church	713.044	097.727	46.021627°N 8.898426°E
10520		Necropolis a Forcora		711.870	097.150	46.016632°N 8.883132°E

== Campo ==
KGS No.^{?}	Picture	Name	Street Address	CH1903 X coordinate	CH1903 Y coordinate	Location
5361	Case Pedrazzini E Oratorio Di S. Giovanni Battista	Case Pedrazzini E Oratorio Di S. Giovanni Battista		681.389	126.958	46.289105°N 8.49479°E
5362	Parish Church of S. Bernardo e Via Crucis	Parish Church of S. Bernardo e Via Crucis		681.691	126.889	46.288448°N 8.498697°E
Unknown		ISOS villaggio: Campo Vallemaggia				
Unknown		ISOS villaggio: Cimalmotto				

== Capriasca ==
KGS No.^{?}	Picture	Name	Street Address	CH1903 X coordinate	CH1903 Y coordinate	Location
5531	Church of Ss. Pietro E Paolo	Church of Ss. Pietro E Paolo	Lugaggia	718.733	101.044	46.050483°N 8.972709°E
5761	Parish Church of Ss. Antonio, Giacomo e Filippo	Parish Church of Ss. Antonio, Giacomo e Filippo	Vaglio, via alla Chiesa	717.469	102.268	46.061712°N 8.956687°E
10392	Chiesa plebana di S. Stefano	Chiesa plebana di S. Stefano	Tesserete, via alla Church	718.143	102.938	46.06762°N 8.965564°E
8639	Complesso del Convento di S. Maria Assunta e Museo a	Complesso del Convento di S. Maria Assunta e Museo a		716.973	103.423	46.072186°N 8.950567°E
9683	Torre e Settlement medievale a Redde	Torre e Settlement medievale a Redde	Vaglio	717.830	101.215	46.052179°N 8.961087°E
Unknown		ISOS villaggio: Bidogno				
Unknown		ISOS villaggio: Sala Capriasca				

== Caslano ==
KGS No.^{?}	Picture	Name	Street Address	CH1903 X coordinate	CH1903 Y coordinate	Location
Unknown		ISOS villaggio: Caslano				

== Castel San Pietro ==
KGS No.^{?}	Picture	Name	Street Address	CH1903 X coordinate	CH1903 Y coordinate	Location
5385	Church of S. Pietro (Chiesa Rossa) E Ruderi Del Castello	Church of S. Pietro (Chiesa Rossa) E Ruderi Del Castello	Via Al Ponte	722.333	079.796	45.858747°N 9.013701°E
5384	Parish Church of S. Eusebio	Parish Church of S. Eusebio	via alla Church	722.026	079.898	45.85972°N 9.009775°E
5387		Villa Turconi a Loverciano	via Loverciano	721.465	080.105	45.861682°N 9.002607°E
Unknown		ISOS villaggio: Casima				
Unknown		ISOS villaggio: Castel San Pietro				
Unknown		ISOS villaggio: Monte				
Unknown		ISOS casale/piccolo villaggio: Campora				

== Centovalli ==
KGS No.^{?}	Picture	Name	Street Address	CH1903 X coordinate	CH1903 Y coordinate	Location
5665	Parish Church of S. Michele, Piazza	Parish Church of S. Michele, Piazza	Palagnedra, piazza Chiesa	692.042	112.227	46.155233°N 8.630108°E
Unknown		ISOS villaggio: Borgnone				
Unknown		ISOS villaggio: Costa				
Unknown		ISOS villaggio: Golino				
Unknown		ISOS villaggio: Intragna				
Unknown		ISOS villaggio: Lionza				
Unknown		ISOS villaggio: Palagnedra				
Unknown		ISOS villaggio: Rasa				
Unknown		ISOS villaggio: Verdasio				
Unknown		ISOS casale / piccolo villaggio: Bordei				

== Cerentino ==
KGS No.^{?}	Picture	Name	Street Address	CH1903 X coordinate	CH1903 Y coordinate	Location
Unknown		ISOS casale / piccolo villaggio: Corino				

== Cevio ==
KGS No.^{?}	Picture	Name	Street Address	CH1903 X coordinate	CH1903 Y coordinate	Location
9273	Respini-Moretti House	Respini-Moretti House	Piazza	689.541	130.148	46.316762°N 8.601174°E
5402; 8566	Case Franzoni e Museo di Valmaggia	Case Franzoni e Museo di Valmaggia		689.549	130.609	46.320907°N 8.601366°E
5400	Case Franzoni e Museo di Valmaggia Chiesa di S. Maria del Ponte alla Rovana	Case Franzoni e Museo di Valmaggia Chiesa di S. Maria del Ponte alla Rovana		689.346	129.740	46.313118°N 8.598564°E
5403	Parish Church, Medieval Religious Site of Cevio vecchio, Church of S. Maria Assunta e S. Giovanni with Ossuary and Portico	Parish Church, Medieval Religious Site of Cevio vecchio, Church of S. Maria Assunta e S. Giovanni with Ossuary and Portico		689.615	130.760	46.322257°N 8.602252°E
5401	Pretorio	Pretorio		689.561	130.107	46.316391°N 8.601425°E
Unknown		ISOS villaggio: Bignasco				
Unknown		ISOS villaggio: Boschetto				
Unknown		ISOS villaggio: Cevio/Rovana				
Unknown		ISOS caso particolare: Val Bavona				

== Chiasso ==
KGS No.^{?}	Picture	Name	Street Address	CH1903 X coordinate	CH1903 Y coordinate	Location
Unknown		ISOS caso particolare: Chiasso				

== Coldrerio ==
KGS No.^{?}	Picture	Name	Street Address	CH1903 X coordinate	CH1903 Y coordinate	Location
10531	Torbiera	Torbiera		720.250	079.300	45.854659°N 8.986763°E
Unknown		ISOS villaggio: Coldrerio				
Unknown		ISOS villaggio: Villa				

== Collina d'Oro ==
KGS No.^{?}	Picture	Name	Street Address	CH1903 X coordinate	CH1903 Y coordinate	Location
5614	Camuzzi House	Camuzzi House	Montagnola, Via Camuzzi	714.728	093.478	45.983128°N 8.919132°E
5464	Cimitero	Cimitero	Gentilino, via ai Canvetti	715.294	094.149	45.989067°N 8.926598°E
5463	Parish Church of S. Abbondio with Ossuary and Via Crucis	Parish Church of S. Abbondio with Ossuary and Via Crucis	Gentilino, via Sant’Abbondio	715.400	094.083	45.988455°N 8.92795°E

== Cugnasco-Gerra ==
KGS No.^{?}	Picture	Name	Street Address	CH1903 X coordinate	CH1903 Y coordinate	Location
5441	Oratory of SS. Anna e Cristoforo a Curogna	Oratory of SS. Anna e Cristoforo a Curogna	Cugnasco	713.292	115.817	46.184285°N 8.905995°E
5442		Oratory of S. Martino a Ditto	Cugnasco	711.928	116.074	46.186824°N 8.888394°E

== Curio ==
KGS No.^{?}	Picture	Name	Street Address	CH1903 X coordinate	CH1903 Y coordinate	Location
8567	Museo Del Malcantone	Museo Del Malcantone		710.237	095.578	46.002762°N 8.861683°E
Unknown		ISOS villaggio: Curio				

== Faido ==
KGS No.^{?}	Picture	Name	Street Address	CH1903 X coordinate	CH1903 Y coordinate	Location
5452	Selvini House	Selvini House	Faido	704.278	148.434	46.479106°N 8.796581°E
5409	Church of S. Maria Assunta	Church of S. Maria Assunta	Chiggiogna	706.326	147.197	46.467658°N 8.822961°E
5709	Parish Church of SS. Lorenzo e Agata	Parish Church of SS. Lorenzo e Agata	Rossura	706.452	148.006	46.474915°N 8.824787°E
5410	Church of S. Ambrogio	Church of S. Ambrogio		708.019	142.249	46.422884°N 8.843844°E
5411		Torre Pedrini		708.045	142.230	46.422709°N 8.844178°E
5569		Parish Church of S. Siro		703.554	149.537	46.489139°N 8.787401°E
Unknown		ISOS villaggio urbanizzato: Faido				
Unknown		ISOS villaggio: Calonico				
Unknown		ISOS villaggio: Rossura				
Unknown		ISOS villaggio: Tengia				
Unknown		ISOS casale/piccolo villaggio: Figgione				
Unknown		ISOS villaggio: Anzonico				
Unknown		ISOS villaggio: Calpiogna				
Unknown		ISOS casale/piccolo villaggio: Primadengo				
Unknown	ISOS villaggio: Chironico	ISOS villaggio: Chironico				
Unknown		ISOS villaggio: Brusgnano-Freggio				
Unknown		ISOS villaggio: Osco				
Unknown		ISOS villaggio: Sobrio-Ronzano				

== Gambarogno ==
KGS No.^{?}	Picture	Name	Street Address	CH1903 X coordinate	CH1903 Y coordinate	Location
5562	Complesso di S. Carlo: chiesa e casa parrocchiale	Complesso di S. Carlo: chiesa e casa parrocchiale	Magadino	709.584	111.668	46.147582°N 8.857009°E
9125	Villa Ghisler	Villa Ghisler	Magadino, vicolo Tamaro 7	709.541	111.733	46.148173°N 8.856467°E
Unknown		ISOS villaggio: Magadino-Rivabella				
Unknown		ISOS villaggio: Indemini				

== Giornico ==
KGS No.^{?}	Picture	Name	Street Address	CH1903 X coordinate	CH1903 Y coordinate	Location
10455		Caslasc	Ruderi	710.250	139.020	46.393479°N 8.872093°E
5470	Church of S. Maria del Castello	Church of S. Maria del Castello		710.166	139.875	46.401183°N 8.871204°E
5471	Church of S. Nicolao	Church of S. Nicolao	Rivascia	710.402	139.804	46.400506°N 8.874256°E
5472	Church of S. Pellegrino	Church of S. Pellegrino		709.468	141.053	46.411892°N 8.862408°E
5473		Torre di Attone		710.596	140.100	46.403136°N 8.876848°E
Unknown		ISOS villaggio: Giornico				

== Lavertezzo ==
KGS No.^{?}	Picture	Name	Street Address	CH1903 X coordinate	CH1903 Y coordinate	Location
Unknown		ISOS villaggio: Lavertezzo				

== Lavizzara ==
KGS No.^{?}	Picture	Name	Street Address	CH1903 X coordinate	CH1903 Y coordinate	Location
10533		A Mott D’Orei Settlement	Fusio	693.930	144.150	46.442104°N 8.66098°E
Unknown		ISOS villaggio: Broglio				
Unknown		ISOS villaggio: Brontallo				
Unknown		ISOS villaggio: Fusio				
Unknown	ISOS villaggio: Prato	ISOS villaggio: Prato				
Unknown		ISOS villaggio: Sornico				
Unknown		ISOS casale/piccolo villaggio: Cortignelli				

== Ligornetto ==
KGS No.^{?}	Picture	Name	Street Address	CH1903 X coordinate	CH1903 Y coordinate	Location
5503; 8631	Museo Vela House	Museo Vela House		717.384	080.286	45.864029°N 8.95012°E
Unknown		ISOS villaggio: Ligornetto				

== Linescio ==
KGS No.^{?}	Picture	Name	Street Address	CH1903 X coordinate	CH1903 Y coordinate	Location
Unknown		ISOS villaggio: Linescio				

== Locarno ==
KGS No.^{?}	Picture	Name	Street Address	CH1903 X coordinate	CH1903 Y coordinate	Location
9266	Casorella	Casorella	Via Bartolomeo Rusca 5	704.642	113.886	46.168316°N 8.793552°E
5508	Church of S. Francesco and former convent	Church of S. Francesco and former convent	Piazza San Francesco 19	704.507	113.837	46.167896°N 8.791793°E
5509	Church of S. Maria Assunta (new church) and House of the Canons	Church of S. Maria Assunta (new church) and House of the Canons	via Cittadella	704.660	114.017	46.169492°N 8.793814°E
5510	Church of S. Maria in Selva with Cemetery	Church of S. Maria in Selva with Cemetery	via Vallemaggia	704.225	114.053	46.169883°N 8.788191°E
5507; 11788	Castello Visconteo Complex with museum and archeological collection	Castello Visconteo Complex with museum and archeological collection	piazza Castello	704.629	113.848	46.167976°N 8.793375°E
11762	Cantonal Library	Cantonal Library	Palazzo Morettini	704.745	114.175	46.170899°N 8.79495°E
8637	Pinacoteca comunale Casa Rusca	Pinacoteca comunale Casa Rusca	piazza Sant’Antonio	704.482	114.012	46.169474°N 8.791509°E
9490	Ai Saleggi Primary School	Ai Saleggi Primary School	via delle Scuole	704.675	113.222	46.162339°N 8.793831°E
9491	Secondary School	Secondary School	via Dr. G. Varesi 30	704.788	113.357	46.163535°N 8.795324°E
Unknown		ISOS città: Locarno				

== Losone ==
KGS No.^{?}	Picture	Name	Street Address	CH1903 X coordinate	CH1903 Y coordinate	Location
9492	Scuola Media	Scuola Media	Via Primore 13	702.597	113.847	46.16828°N 8.76707°E

== Lugano ==
KGS No.^{?}	Picture	Name	Street Address	CH1903 X coordinate	CH1903 Y coordinate	Location
5535; 9347	Biblioteca Cantonale	Biblioteca Cantonale	Viale Carlo Cattaneo 6	717.822	095.884	46.004235°N 8.959649°E
9310	Biblioteca «Salita dei Frati»	Biblioteca «Salita dei Frati»	salita dei Frati 4	717.005	096.306	46.008172°N 8.94921°E
5532	Cathedral of S. Lorenzo	Cathedral of S. Lorenzo	via Cattedrale	716.962	095.909	46.004609°N 8.948556°E
5533	Church of S. Maria degli Angioli	Church of S. Maria degli Angioli	piazza Bernardino Luin 4	717.009	095.399	46.000014°N 8.949036°E
5545	Church of S. Rocco	Church of S. Rocco	piazzetta San Rocco 1	717.379	095.913	46.004573°N 8.953939°E
10282	Complesso cimiteriale	Complesso cimiteriale	via Trevano	717.843	097.626	46.019898°N 8.960356°E
5534	Complesso di Villa Ciani	Complesso di Villa Ciani	giardino pubblico e Museo civico	717.580	095.926	46.004655°N 8.956537°E
8799	Fonoteca nazionale svizzera	Fonoteca nazionale svizzera	via Soldino 9	716.291	096.056	46.006047°N 8.939933°E
8627; 8626	Museo cantonale d’arte	Museo cantonale d’arte	via Canova 10	717.327	095.886	46.004339°N 8.953261°E
8644	Museo cantonale di storia naturale	Museo cantonale di storia naturale		717.863	095.969	46.004992°N 8.9602°E
5554	Palazzo civico (Town Hall)	Palazzo civico (Town Hall)	piazza della Riforma	717.172	095.792	46.00352°N 8.951237°E
10283	Palazzo e cinema Corso	Palazzo e cinema Corso	via Pioda	717.375	096.096	46.006219°N 8.953933°E
5537	Palazzo Riva	Palazzo Riva	via Francesco Soave 9	717.104	095.892	46.004432°N 8.950385°E
5539	Palazzo Riva	Palazzo Riva	via Massimiliano Magatti 2	717.267	095.859	46.004107°N 8.95248°E
5540	Palazzo Riva	Palazzo Riva	via Pretorio 7	717.190	096.032	46.005676°N 8.951529°E
9158	Radiotelevisione svizzera di lingua italiana (RTSI)	Radiotelevisione svizzera di lingua italiana (RTSI)	D+A	716.114	096.314	46.008398°N 8.937712°E
5379	Villa Favorita and park	Villa Favorita and park	Castagnola	719.292	095.454	46.00011°N 8.978512°E
5355	Parish Church of S. Agata	Parish Church of S. Agata	Via Dei Circoli	719.813	100.574	46.046065°N 8.986539°E
5373	Church of Della Madonna D’Ongero	Church of Della Madonna D’Ongero		715.250	089.967	45.951463°N 8.925008°E
5372	Parish Church of SS. Giorgio e Andrea e Loggia comunale	Parish Church of SS. Giorgio e Andrea e Loggia comunale		716.156	090.765	45.958485°N 8.936886°E
5375	Complesso di S. Maria Assunta di Torello	Complesso di S. Maria Assunta di Torello		714.288	089.487	45.947309°N 8.912488°E
5742	Church Provost of S. Giovanni Battista a Corcaréi	Church Provost of S. Giovanni Battista a Corcaréi		720.125	101.900	46.057935°N 8.990908°E
5743	Oratory of S. Martino	Oratory of S. Martino		720.085	102.360	46.062079°N 8.990508°E
Unknown		ISOS città: Lugano				
Unknown		ISOS villaggio: Barbengo				
Unknown		ISOS villaggio: Brè				
Unknown	ISOS villaggio: Gandria	ISOS villaggio: Gandria				
Unknown		ISOS casale/piccolo villaggio: Biogno				
Unknown		ISOS caso particolare: Cantine di Gandria				
Unknown		ISOS caso particolare: Castagnola				
Unknown		ISOS villaggio: Carona				
Unknown		ISOS casale/piccolo villaggio: Ciona				
Unknown		ISOS caso particolare: Torello				
Unknown		ISOS villaggio: Cimadera				
Unknown		ISOS villaggio: Sonvico				

== Maggia ==
KGS No.^{?}	Picture	Name	Street Address	CH1903 X coordinate	CH1903 Y coordinate	Location
5563	Church of S. Maria Delle Grazie In Campagna	Church of S. Maria Delle Grazie In Campagna		698.355	121.836	46.240768°N 8.713835°E
Unknown		ISOS villaggio: Aurigeno				
Unknown		ISOS villaggio: Moghegno				
Unknown		ISOS villaggio: Someo				

== Magliaso ==
KGS No.^{?}	Picture	Name	Street Address	CH1903 X coordinate	CH1903 Y coordinate	Location
10393	S. Giorgio Castle	S. Giorgio Castle		712.351	093.861	45.986972°N 8.888557°E

== Massagno ==
KGS No.^{?}	Picture	Name	Street Address	CH1903 X coordinate	CH1903 Y coordinate	Location
9146	Albairone House Apartments	Albairone House Apartments	Via Ceresio 5–9	716.389	096.350	46.008674°N 8.94127°E

== Mendrisio ==
KGS No.^{?}	Picture	Name	Street Address	CH1903 X coordinate	CH1903 Y coordinate	Location
5586	Croci House	Croci House	Via Municipio 13	720.176	081.186	45.871634°N 8.986289°E
10550	Dei Pagani Tre Buchi House	Dei Pagani Tre Buchi House		720.430	082.050	45.879359°N 8.989779°E
5590	Church of S. Sisinio alla Torre	Church of S. Sisinio alla Torre		720.420	080.860	45.868658°N 8.989348°E
5582	Church of S. Martino	Church of S. Martino		719.770	081.995	45.878981°N 8.981267°E
5583	Complex of S. Giovanni: Convent, Church of S. Giovanni, Oratory of S. Maria	Complex of S. Giovanni: Convent, Church of S. Giovanni, Oratory of S. Maria	via Vecchio Ginnasio 30	720.317	081.312	45.872742°N 8.988137°E
5584	Palazzo Pollini	Palazzo Pollini	via Portico Virunio	720.230	080.947	45.869475°N 8.986924°E
5585		Palazzo Torriani	via Paolo Torriani 1	720.339	081.086	45.870705°N 8.988362°E
8633	Rancate, Pinacoteca cantonale Giovanni Züst	Rancate, Pinacoteca cantonale Giovanni Züst	via Pinacoteca Züst	718.809	081.106	45.871155°N 8.968669°E
10456		Tremona, Medieval Settlement with Scattered Prehistoric Objects		718.100	082.650	45.885165°N 8.959927°E
5595	Villa Argentina	Villa Argentina	Largo Bernasconi 2	720.076	080.711	45.867379°N 8.984881°E
5581	Villa con mosaico a S. Maria in Borgo	Villa con mosaico a S. Maria in Borgo	via Santa Maria	720.350	081.230	45.871998°N 8.988541°E
Unknown		ISOS borgo: Mendrisio				
Unknown		ISOS villaggio: Arzo				
Unknown		ISOS villaggio: Rancate				

== Meride ==
KGS No.^{?}	Picture	Name	Street Address	CH1903 X coordinate	CH1903 Y coordinate	Location
5600	Church of S. Silvestro	Church of S. Silvestro		717.259	083.395	45.892011°N 8.949281°E
Unknown		ISOS villaggio: Meride				

== Mezzovico-Vira ==
KGS No.^{?}	Picture	Name	Street Address	CH1903 X coordinate	CH1903 Y coordinate	Location
5604	Church of S. Mamete	Church of S. Mamete	Via S. Mamete	714.699	105.567	46.091859°N 8.921705°E
5603	Oratory of S. Ambrogio	Oratory of S. Ambrogio		715.551	106.243	46.097794°N 8.932885°E

== Miglieglia ==
KGS No.^{?}	Picture	Name	Street Address	CH1903 X coordinate	CH1903 Y coordinate	Location
5606	Church of S. Stefano Al Colle with Ossuary	Church of S. Stefano Al Colle with Ossuary		709.843	098.098	46.025491°N 8.857186°E

== Minusio ==
KGS No.^{?}	Picture	Name	Street Address	CH1903 X coordinate	CH1903 Y coordinate	Location
5609	Ca’ Di Ferro E Oratorio Della Vergine Dei Sette Dolori A Rivaplana	Ca’ Di Ferro E Oratorio Della Vergine Dei Sette Dolori A Rivaplana		706.921	114.710	46.175369°N 8.823243°E

== Monteceneri ==
created on 21 November 2010 from Medeglia, Bironico, Camignolo, Rivera and Sigirino

KGS No.^{?}	Picture	Name	Street Address	CH1903 X coordinate	CH1903 Y coordinate	Location
10561		Ruderi Del Castello Di S. Sofia		715.790	108.340	46.116613°N 8.936493°E
11742; 10301	Stazione Radio Monte Ceneri	Stazione Radio Monte Ceneri		714.213	110.933	46.140203°N 8.916729°E
Unknown		ISOS casale / piccolo villaggio: Osignano				

== Morbio Inferiore ==
KGS No.^{?}	Picture	Name	Street Address	CH1903 X coordinate	CH1903 Y coordinate	Location
5624	Sanctuary of S. Maria Dei Miracoli	Sanctuary of S. Maria Dei Miracoli	Salita Alla Basilica	722.416	079.240	45.853732°N 9.014625°E
9495	Secondary School (Scuola media)	Secondary School (Scuola media)		723.191	078.432	45.846325°N 9.02439°E
11700		Villa Valsangiacomo, Archeological Site		722.880	078.002	45.842514°N 9.020276°E

== Morcote ==
KGS No.^{?}	Picture	Name	Street Address	CH1903 X coordinate	CH1903 Y coordinate	Location
10290	Chapel of S. Antonio Abate Con Scalinata Monumentale	Chapel of S. Antonio Abate Con Scalinata Monumentale		714.457	086.732	45.922503°N 8.914°E
5629; 5628	Parish Church of S. Maria del Sasso with Oratory	Parish Church of S. Maria del Sasso with Oratory		714.466	086.795	45.923068°N 8.914131°E
5632	Cimitero monumentale	Cimitero monumentale		714.513	086.868	45.923716°N 8.914754°E
9496		Scherrer Park		714.210	086.901	45.924064°N 8.910857°E
Unknown	ISOS villaggio: Morcote	ISOS villaggio: Morcote				

== Muralto ==
KGS No.^{?}	Picture	Name	Street Address	CH1903 X coordinate	CH1903 Y coordinate	Location
5639	Collegiata Di S. Vittore	Collegiata Di S. Vittore	Via San Vittore	705.530	114.404	46.172837°N 8.805164°E
10293	Grand Hotel	Grand Hotel	via Sempione 15–17	705.045	114.330	46.172247°N 8.798869°E
10535		Vicus	via della Collegiata / via del Municipio	705.380	114.450	46.173274°N 8.803233°E

== Muzzano ==
KGS No.^{?}	Picture	Name	Street Address	CH1903 X coordinate	CH1903 Y coordinate	Location
Unknown		ISOS villaggio: Muzzano				

== Novazzano ==
KGS No.^{?}	Picture	Name	Street Address	CH1903 X coordinate	CH1903 Y coordinate	Location
Unknown		ISOS casale/piccolo villaggio: Brusata				

== Onsernone ==
KGS No.^{?}	Picture	Name	Street Address	CH1903 X coordinate	CH1903 Y coordinate	Location
5424		Palazzo Della Barca	Comologno	687.832	117.596	46.204087°N 8.576625°E
8653		Museo Onsernonese	Loco, Strada Cantonale	695.239	117.521	46.202405°N 8.672563°E
Unknown		ISOS villaggio: Auressio				
Unknown		ISOS villaggio: Berzona				
Unknown		ISOS villaggio: Loco				
Unknown		ISOS villaggio: Gresso				
Unknown		ISOS casale/piccolo villagio: Mosogno di sotto				
Unknown		ISOS villaggio: Comologno				
Unknown		ISOS villaggio: Russo				

== Origlio ==
KGS No.^{?}	Picture	Name	Street Address	CH1903 X coordinate	CH1903 Y coordinate	Location
Unknown		ISOS villaggio: Origlio				

== Orselina ==
KGS No.^{?}	Picture	Name	Street Address	CH1903 X coordinate	CH1903 Y coordinate	Location
5661; 11764	Sacro Monte, Church of Dell’Annunziata, Convent and Church of Della Madonna del Sasso e Museo	Sacro Monte, Church of Dell’Annunziata, Convent and Church of Della Madonna del Sasso e Museo	via Santuario	704.659	114.651	46.175194°N 8.793943°E

== Personico ==
KGS No.^{?}	Picture	Name	Street Address	CH1903 X coordinate	CH1903 Y coordinate	Location
10295	Centrale Elettrica Comandi Biaschina	Centrale Elettrica Comandi Biaschina		714.675	135.930	46.364946°N 8.92885°E

== Ponte Capriasca ==
KGS No.^{?}	Picture	Name	Street Address	CH1903 X coordinate	CH1903 Y coordinate	Location
5674	Parish Church of Di S. Ambrogio	Parish Church of Di S. Ambrogio	Via Alla Church	716.909	102.294	46.062043°N 8.949459°E

== Prato Leventina ==
KGS No.^{?}	Picture	Name	Street Address	CH1903 X coordinate	CH1903 Y coordinate	Location
10297		Dazio Vecchio		700.800	149.310	46.487517°N 8.751488°E

== Pura ==
KGS No.^{?}	Picture	Name	Street Address	CH1903 X coordinate	CH1903 Y coordinate	Location
10536		Luogo di culto ai Monti Mondini		709.840	094.020	45.988815°N 8.856196°E

== Quinto ==
KGS No.^{?}	Picture	Name	Street Address	CH1903 X coordinate	CH1903 Y coordinate	Location
5693	Parish Church of SS. Pietro e Paolo	Parish Church of SS. Pietro e Paolo	cripta	697.666	151.871	46.511016°N 8.711219°E
Unknown		ISOS villaggio: Altanca				
Unknown		ISOS villaggio: Piotta				
Unknown		ISOS villaggio: Quinto				
Unknown		ISOS villaggio: Ronco				

== Riva San Vitale ==
KGS No.^{?}	Picture	Name	Street Address	CH1903 X coordinate	CH1903 Y coordinate	Location
5700	Battistero Di S. Giovanni	Battistero Di S. Giovanni	Via Settala	718.910	084.825	45.904584°N 8.970904°E
9144		Bianchi House	via Formeggie 6	718.763	086.231	45.917255°N 8.969364°E
5701	Church of S. Croce	Church of S. Croce	via Santa Croce	718.816	085.070	45.906804°N 8.969755°E
9272		Palazzo della Croce	piazza Valleggio 6	718.833	085.024	45.906388°N 8.969963°E
Unknown		ISOS borgo: Riva San Vitale				

== Serravalle ==
KGS No.^{?}	Picture	Name	Street Address	CH1903 X coordinate	CH1903 Y coordinate	Location
5572	Casa dei pagani (cave castle and other buildings)	Casa dei pagani (cave castle and other buildings)	Malvaglia	718.960	141.120	46.410879°N 8.985849°E
5570	Parish Church of S. Martino with Ossuary and Churchyard	Parish Church of S. Martino with Ossuary and Churchyard	Malvaglia	718.808	140.303	46.403558°N 8.983664°E
5725	Parish Church of S. Maria Assunta with Ossuary	Parish Church of S. Maria Assunta with Ossuary	Semione, Via Cantonale	717.898	140.766	46.407882°N 8.97195°E
5727		Oratory of S. Maria Bambina a Navone	Semione	717.038	141.528	46.414886°N 8.960961°E
5726	Ruins of Serravalle Castle	Ruins of Serravalle Castle	Semione	717.962	141.254	46.41226°N 8.972907°E
Unknown		ISOS villaggio: Rongie/Orino				
Unknown		ISOS caso particolare: Val Malvaglia				
Unknown		ISOS villaggio: Semione				
Unknown		ISOS casale / piccolo villaggio: Navone				

== Stabio ==
KGS No.^{?}	Picture	Name	Street Address	CH1903 X coordinate	CH1903 Y coordinate	Location
Unknown		ISOS borgo: Stabio				

== Terre di Pedemonte ==
KGS No.^{?}	Picture	Name	Street Address	CH1903 X coordinate	CH1903 Y coordinate	Location
5752	Castelliere, Scattered Prehistoric Items and Roman Buildings	Castelliere, Scattered Prehistoric Items and Roman Buildings		701.200	116.250	46.190104°N 8.749505°E
Unknown		ISOS village: Verscio				

== Tresa ==
KGS No.^{?}	Picture	Name	Street Address	CH1903 X coordinate	CH1903 Y coordinate	Location
Unknown		ISOS village: Castelrotto				
Unknown		ISOS village: Sessa				

== Val Mara ==
KGS No.^{?}	Picture	Name	Street Address	CH1903 X coordinate	CH1903 Y coordinate	Location
5577		Della Madonna Del Castelletto Church	Via Alla Madonna	720.385	086.538	45.91973°N 8.990342°E
5710	Oratory of S. Vigilio	Oratory of S. Vigilio	Via San Vigilio	719.890	087.987	45.932849°N 8.984332°E
Unknown		ISOS villaggio: Melano				
Unknown		ISOS villaggio: Rovio				

== Verzasca ==
KGS No.^{?}	Picture	Name	Street Address	CH1903 X coordinate	CH1903 Y coordinate	Location
Unknown		ISOS village: Brione Verzasca				
Unknown		ISOS village: Corippo				
Unknown		ISOS village: Sonogno				

== Vezia ==
KGS No.^{?}	Picture	Name	Street Address	CH1903 X coordinate	CH1903 Y coordinate	Location
10515	S. Martino, Medieval Settlement and Place of Worship	S. Martino, Medieval Settlement and Place of Worship		716.310	098.310	46.026316°N 8.940735°E
5764	Villa Negroni with park	Villa Negroni with park		715.945	098.491	46.028006°N 8.936067°E
