= Bironico =

- Former municipality
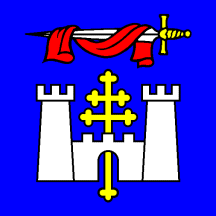
- Flag Coat of arms
- Location of Bironico
- Location within Switzerland Location within Canton of Ticino
- Coordinates: 46°07′N 8°56′E
- Country: Switzerland
- Canton: Ticino
- District: Lugano
- Municipality: Monteceneri

Area
  - Total: 4.18 km^{2} (1.61 sq mi)
- Elevation: 465 m (1,526 ft)

Population (December 2002)
  - Total: 515
  - Density: 123/km^{2} (319/sq mi)
- Time zone: UTC+01:00 (CET)
  - Summer (DST): UTC+02:00 (CEST)
- Postal code: 6804
- SFOS number: 5153
- ISO 3166 code: CH-TI
- Surrounded by: Cadenazzo, Camignolo, Medeglia, Rivera
- Website: www.bironico.ch

Bironico is a village in the northern end of the district of Lugano in the canton of Ticino in Switzerland.

The municipalities of Medeglia, Bironico, Camignolo, Rivera and Sigirino merged on 21 November 2010 into the new municipality of Monteceneri.

== History ==
Bironico is first mentioned in 1296 as Bironico. By 1000, Bironico was probably the secular and religious center of Carvina, which included the middle and upper Vedeggio valley. For example, former parish included the villages of Camignolo, Ison, Medeglia, Mezzovico-Vira, Rivera, Robasacco and Sigirino. In the Early Middle Ages it was under the authority of the bishop of Como, followed by the city of Como. At the end of the 13th century, the Rusca, a noble family from Como, lived in the community. They lived in the castle between 1328 and 1416. Starting in the 16th century, an inn at the bridge over the Leguana served as a meeting place of the Swiss Confederation's ministers.

The parish church is from 1267 and is dedicated to St. Martin.

In the past, the local economy relied on traditional alpine agriculture and emigration. Trade and industry have recently increased, but the current economic structure is dominated by commuters to the lower Vedeggio valley, Lugano and Bellinzona.

== Geography ==
Aerial view (1964)

Bironico has an area, as of 1997, of 4.18 square kilometers (1.61 sq mi). Of this area, 0.47 km^{2} (0.18 sq mi) or 11.2% is used for agricultural purposes, while 3.24 km^{2} (1.25 sq mi) or 77.5% is forested. Of the rest of the land, 0.27 km^{2} (0.10 sq mi) or 6.5% is settled (buildings or roads), 0.02 km^{2} (4.9 acres) or 0.5% is either rivers or lakes and 0.18 km^{2} (0.069 sq mi) or 4.3% is unproductive land.

Of the built up area, industrial buildings made up 1.4% of the total area while housing and buildings made up 3.1% and transportation infrastructure made up 1.2%. Out of the forested land, 72.5% of the total land area is heavily forested and 1.9% is covered with orchards or small clusters of trees. Of the agricultural land, 5.7% is used for growing crops, while 2.4% is used for orchards or vine crops and 3.1% is used for alpine pastures. All the water in the municipality is flowing water. Of the unproductive areas, 4.1% is unproductive vegetation.

Bironico is located south of the Monte Ceneri Pass and north of the district seat Lugano. Its area code is 091. Neighbouring villages are Camignolo to the south, Medeglia to the north and Rivera to the west.

== Coat of arms ==
The blazon of the municipal coat of arms is Azure a castle argent in front of a patriarchal cross bottony or and in chief on a sword of the second hilted and pommed of the third a cloak gules. The castle represents a castle erected in 1418 by the Count Giov. Giacomo Rusca. The patriarchal cross is that of the Cardinal Agostino Oreggio from Bironico, archbishop of Benevento from 1633 to 1635 and the sword and cloak is from S. Martin, the patron saint of the church.

== Demographics ==
As of 2008, 18.4% of the population are resident foreign nationals. Over the last 10 years (1997-2007) the population has changed at a rate of 21%.

Most of the population (as of 2000) speaks Italian (91.0%), with German being second most common (3.3%) and Serbo-Croatian being third (2.1%). Of the Swiss national languages (as of 2000), 17 speak German, 1 person speaks French, 466 people speak Italian, and 2 people speak Romansh. The remainder (26 people) speak another language.

As of 2008, the gender distribution of the population was 50.9% male and 49.1% female. The population was made up of 262 Swiss men (41.9% of the population), and 56 (9.0%) non-Swiss men. There were 261 Swiss women (41.8%), and 46 (7.4%) non-Swiss women.

In 2008 there were 7 live births to Swiss citizens and 2 births to non-Swiss citizens, and in same time span there were 4 deaths of Swiss citizens. Ignoring immigration and emigration, the population of Swiss citizens increased by 3 while the foreign population increased by 2. There was 1 Swiss man who immigrated back to Switzerland and 1 Swiss woman who emigrated from Switzerland. At the same time, there were 2 non-Swiss men and 3 non-Swiss women who immigrated from another country to Switzerland. The total Swiss population change in 2008 (from all sources, including moves across municipal borders) was an increase of 9 and the non-Swiss population change was an increase of 3 people. This represents a population growth rate of 1.9%.

The age distribution, as of 2009, in Bironico is; 76 children or 12.2% of the population are between 0 and 9 years old and 73 teenagers or 11.7% are between 10 and 19. Of the adult population, 66 people or 10.6% of the population are between 20 and 29 years old. 98 people or 15.7% are between 30 and 39, 107 people or 17.1% are between 40 and 49, and 76 people or 12.2% are between 50 and 59. The senior population distribution is 60 people or 9.6% of the population are between 60 and 69 years old, 44 people or 7.0% are between 70 and 79, there are 25 people or 4.0% who are over 80.

As of 2000 the average number of residents per living room was 0.61 which is about equal to the cantonal average of 0.6 per room. In this case, a room is defined as space of a housing unit of at least 4 m^{2} (43 sq ft) as normal bedrooms, dining rooms, living rooms, kitchens and habitable cellars and attics. About 48.1% of the total households were owner occupied, or in other words did not pay rent (though they may have a mortgage or a rent-to-own agreement).

As of 2000, there were 212 private households in the village, and an average of 2.4 persons per household. In 2000 there were 124 single family homes (or 70.9% of the total) out of a total of 175 inhabited buildings. There were 31 two family buildings (17.7%) and 11 multi-family buildings (6.3%). There were also 9 buildings in the village that were multipurpose buildings (used for both housing and commercial or another purpose).

The vacancy rate for the village, in 2008, was 0.37%. In 2000 there were 252 apartments in the village. The most common apartment size was the 4 room apartment of which there were 80. There were 14 single room apartments and 65 apartments with five or more rooms. Of these apartments, a total of 212 apartments (84.1% of the total) were permanently occupied, while 39 apartments (15.5%) were seasonally occupied and 1 apartments (0.4%) were empty. As of 2007, the construction rate of new housing units was 1.6 new units per 1000 residents.

The historical population is given in the following chart:

== Heritage sites of national significance ==
The Ruderi Del Castello Di S. Sofia and Stazione Radio Monte Ceneri (shared with Rivera) are listed as Swiss heritage site of national significance.

== Politics ==
In the 2007 federal election the most popular party was the FDP which received 37.02% of the vote. The next three most popular parties were the CVP (25.83%), the Ticino League (12.5%) and the SVP (11.67%). In the federal election, a total of 190 votes were cast, and the voter turnout was 48.7%.

In the 2007 Gran Consiglio election, there were a total of 373 registered voters in Bironico, of which 266 or 71.3% voted. 4 blank ballots were cast, leaving 262 valid ballots in the election. The most popular party was the PLRT which received 99 or 37.8% of the vote. The next three most popular parties were; the PPD+GenGiova (with 66 or 25.2%), the LEGA (with 36 or 13.7%) and the SSI (with 29 or 11.1%).

In the 2007 Consiglio di Stato election, 2 blank ballots were cast, leaving 264 valid ballots in the election. The most popular party was the PLRT which received 96 or 36.4% of the vote. The next three most popular parties were; the PPD (with 68 or 25.8%), the LEGA (with 42 or 15.9%) and the SSI (with 29 or 11.0%).

== Economy ==
As of 2007, Bironico had an unemployment rate of 4.62%. As of 2005, there were 6 people employed in the primary economic sector and about 2 businesses involved in this sector. 75 people were employed in the secondary sector and there were 10 businesses in this sector. 158 people were employed in the tertiary sector, with 31 businesses in this sector. There were 246 residents of the village who were employed in some capacity, of which females made up 37.8% of the workforce.

In 2000, there were 183 workers who commuted into the village and 190 workers who commuted away. The village is a net exporter of workers, with about 1.0 workers leaving the village for every one entering. About 12.6% of the workforce coming into Bironico are coming from outside Switzerland. Of the working population, 4.9% used public transportation to get to work, and 67.5% used a private car. As of 2009, there was one hotel in Bironico.

== Religion ==
From the 2000 census, 432 or 84.4% were Roman Catholic, while 22 or 4.3% belonged to the Swiss Reformed Church. There are 40 individuals (or about 7.81% of the population) who belong to another church (not listed on the census), and 18 individuals (or about 3.52% of the population) did not answer the question.

== Education ==
The entire Swiss population is generally well educated. In Bironico about 68.8% of the population (between age 25 and 64) have completed either non-mandatory upper secondary education or additional higher education (either University or a Fachhochschule).

In Bironico there were a total of 126 students (as of 2009). The Ticino education system provides up to three years of non-mandatory kindergarten and in Bironico there were 25 children in kindergarten. The primary school program lasts for five years and includes both a standard school and a special school. In the village, 38 students attended the standard primary schools and 1 student attended the special school. In the lower secondary school system, students either attend a two-year middle school followed by a two-year pre-apprenticeship or they attend a four-year program to prepare for higher education. There were 30 students in the two-year middle school, while 6 students were in the four-year advanced program.

The upper secondary school includes several options, but at the end of the upper secondary program, a student will be prepared to enter a trade or to continue on to a university or college. In Ticino, vocational students may either attend school while working on their internship or apprenticeship (which takes three or four years) or may attend school followed by an internship or apprenticeship (which takes one year as a full-time student or one and a half to two years as a part-time student). There were 5 vocational students who were attending school full-time and 20 who attend part-time.

The professional program lasts three years and prepares a student for a job in engineering, nursing, computer science, business, tourism and similar fields. There was 1 student in the professional program.

As of 2000, there were 17 students in Bironico who came from another village, while 77 residents attended schools outside the village.

== Climate ==
Bironico has a Continental Subarctic climate (Dfc) under the Köppen climate classification. The average annual temperature is 11 °C (51 °F). The average coldest month was January with an average temperature of 2 °C (35 °F), while the warmest month was July with an average temperature of 21 °C (69 °F). The wettest month was May during which time Bironico received an average of 190 millimeters (7.6 in) of rain or snow. The driest month was February during which time Bironico received an average of 64 millimeters (2.5 in) of rain or snow.

Climate data for Bironico
Month	Jan	Feb	Mar	Apr	May	Jun	Jul	Aug	Sep	Oct	Nov	Dec	Year
Daily mean °C (°F)	2 (35)	4 (39)	7 (44)	11 (51)	15 (59)	18 (64)	21 (69)	20 (68)	17 (62)	12 (53)	7 (44)	3 (37)	11 (51)
Average precipitation mm (inches)	69 (2.7)	64 (2.5)	110 (4.4)	150 (6)	190 (7.6)	190 (7.3)	160 (6.3)	180 (7.1)	180 (7)	180 (7.1)	140 (5.5)	79 (3.1)	1,690 (66.4)

== Transport ==
Bironico is served by the nearby Rivera-Bironico station, on the Gotthard railway.
