= Giovanni Battista Belli-Bernasconi =

Russian architect

Giovanni Battista Belli-Bernasconi (Ivan Petrovich Bernaskoni; Russian: Джиованни/Иван Петрович Бернаскони; 1770 – 16 November 1827) was a Russian architect born in Switzerland. He was the author of many classical buildings and architectural ensembles in Saint Petersburg and its surroundings.

== Early years ==
Giovanni Bernasconi was born Giovanni Battista Belli or Begli in 1770 in Camignolo, a settlement on the northern outskirts of Lugano in Switzerland’s Italian-speaking Ticino canton, and was adopted by Pietro Bernasconi di Bedano. The area, and the Bernasconi family in particular, had produced numerous artists and architects, active across Europe, in England, Spain, Italy and Germany, as well as several distant cousins who had also come to work in Russia.

== Career ==
Bernasconi came to the Russian capital Saint Petersburg in 1801, and submitted a project for the renovation of the city’s Saint Isaac’s Cathedral in 1809. Though the job ultimately went to the Frenchman Auguste de Montferrand, Bernasconi’s proposals won him recognition in Saint Petersburg’s architectural circles, and he was nominated as a member of the Imperial Academy of Arts in 1814. In Russia, he worked on various projects alongside Giacomo Quarenghi of Bergamo and Tommaso Adamini of Agra.

Barracks for an infantry regiment (1812). Bernasconi presented the plan and facade for the building to the Academy of Arts, for which he was recognised as a naznachennyy or "nominee" of the Academy.

Cathedral (1814). To gain the title of Academician, Andrey Voronikhin set Bernasconi the task of "drafting the plans for a building to house a provincial gymnasium". This project was never realised, and instead Bernasconi was admitted to the Academy for an ecclesiastical structure.

Priest's residence at Ilyinskaya Sloboda 15 (1827-1829). Bernasconi designed this extant Empire style two-storey residence for the clergymen of the adjacent Church of the Prophet Elijah at Porokhoviye, Saint Petersburg. The project was constructed under Zakhar Filippovich Krasnopevkov, and has a rusticated lower lower storey and classical facade. Having been used as a day nursery in the 1980s-1990s, the building has since been returned to the Orthodox Church and is used as a library and Sunday school. Several period features have been preserved, including decorations over the windows. Photos and plans may be found in the online report on the building's conservation status.

== Death ==
He died 16 November 1827 in Saint Petersburg of "ex articulari morbi". Serving as the executors of will were Giovanni Battista Lucchini di Montagnola and Gerolamo Rusca di Agno, master builders at Pavlovsk. His wife, Gioconda Rossetti was living in Bedano (near Lugano) at the time of his death, and the architect Domenico Quadri wrote her a letter dated 14 January 14, 1829, stating "I can tell you that we have made a pompous funeral, which will cost some money."
