= Domenico Quadri =

Russian architect

Domenico Quadri (Domeniko/Dementiy Ivanovich Kvadri; Russian: Доменико/Дементий Иванович Квадри; 1772 – 1832) was a Russian architect born in Switzerland. He was the author of many classical buildings and architectural ensembles in Saint Petersburg and its surroundings.

== Biography ==
He was born on 2 October 1772 in Cassina (Agno), near Lugano in Switzerland’s Italian-speaking Ticino canton. He worked on numerous palaces and private residences in Saint Petersburg, alongside his countrymen Giovanni Battista Belli-Bernasconi and Giovanni Battista Lucchini of Montagnola, and Gerolamo Rusca of Agno. He lived in Gatchina, where he was also responsible for many buildings.

Father of a son Viktor, born in Russia, who became a major in the Tsarist army and married Antonina Alexeyvna Bibikova. He was the grandfather of Vladimir Viktorovich Kvadri (1859-?), a Russian and Soviet military engineer and writer, and Viktor Viktorovich Kvadri (1861-1908), an important Russian military author and archaeologist.

He returned from Russia in 1827 and died on 12 January 1833 in Milan.

== Works ==
- Sheremetyev Palace
- Razumovsky Palace
- Residences on Nevsky Prospekt
- Shcherbatov Mansion (now the Kirovets Centre of Culture and Leisure).
- Church of Saint Nicholas (Lutheran) in Gatchina.
