= Monteceneri =

- Municipality
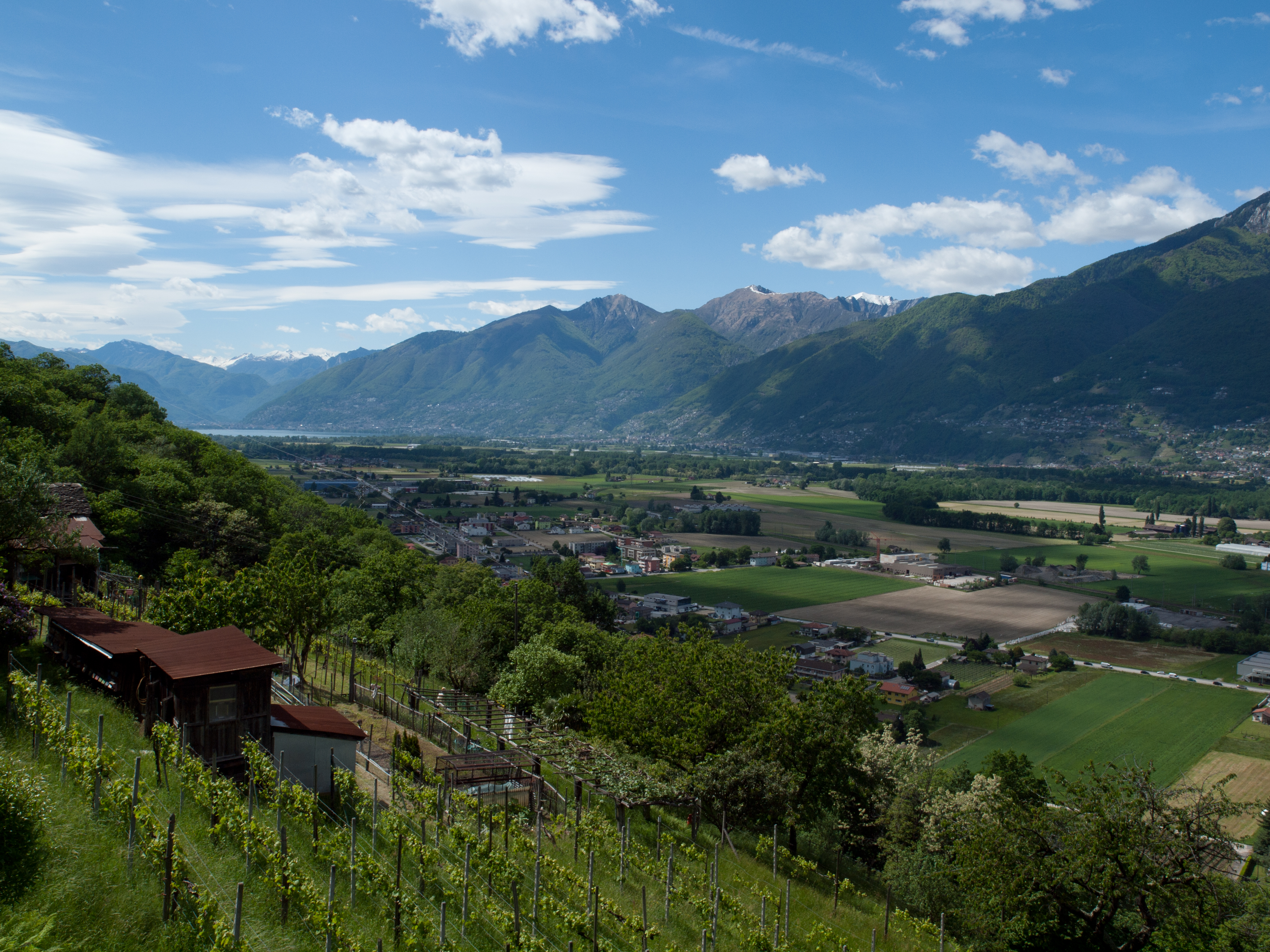

- Flag Coat of arms
- Location of Monteceneri
- Location within Switzerland Location within Canton of Ticino
- Coordinates: 46°7′N 08°56′E
- Country: Switzerland
- Canton: Ticino
- District: Lugano

Government
  - Mayor: Sindaco; Emilio Filippini

Area
  - Total: 37.04 km^{2} (14.30 sq mi)
- Elevation: 196 m (643 ft)

Population (December 2020)
  - Total: 4,535
  - Density: 122.4/km^{2} (317.1/sq mi)
- Time zone: UTC+01:00 (CET)
  - Summer (DST): UTC+02:00 (CEST)
- Postal code: 6573
- SFOS number: 5238
- ISO 3166 code: CH-TI
- Localities: Medeglia, Bironico, Camignolo, Rivera and Sigirino
- Website: http://www.monteceneri.ch SFSO statistics

Monteceneri is a municipality in the district of Lugano in the canton of Ticino in Switzerland. It was created on 21 November 2010 through the merger of the municipalities of Medeglia, Bironico, Camignolo, Rivera and Sigirino. The first mayor elected was Emilio Filippini, who held the position until 2016.^{1}

== History ==
Medeglia is first mentioned in 1195 as Medellia. Bironico is first mentioned in 1296 as Bironico. Camignolo is first mentioned in 1296 as Camigiollo. Rivera is first mentioned in 1296 as Sorenzino. In 1348 it was mentioned as Rivera. Sigirino is first mentioned in 1335 as Sezelino.

=== Medeglia ===
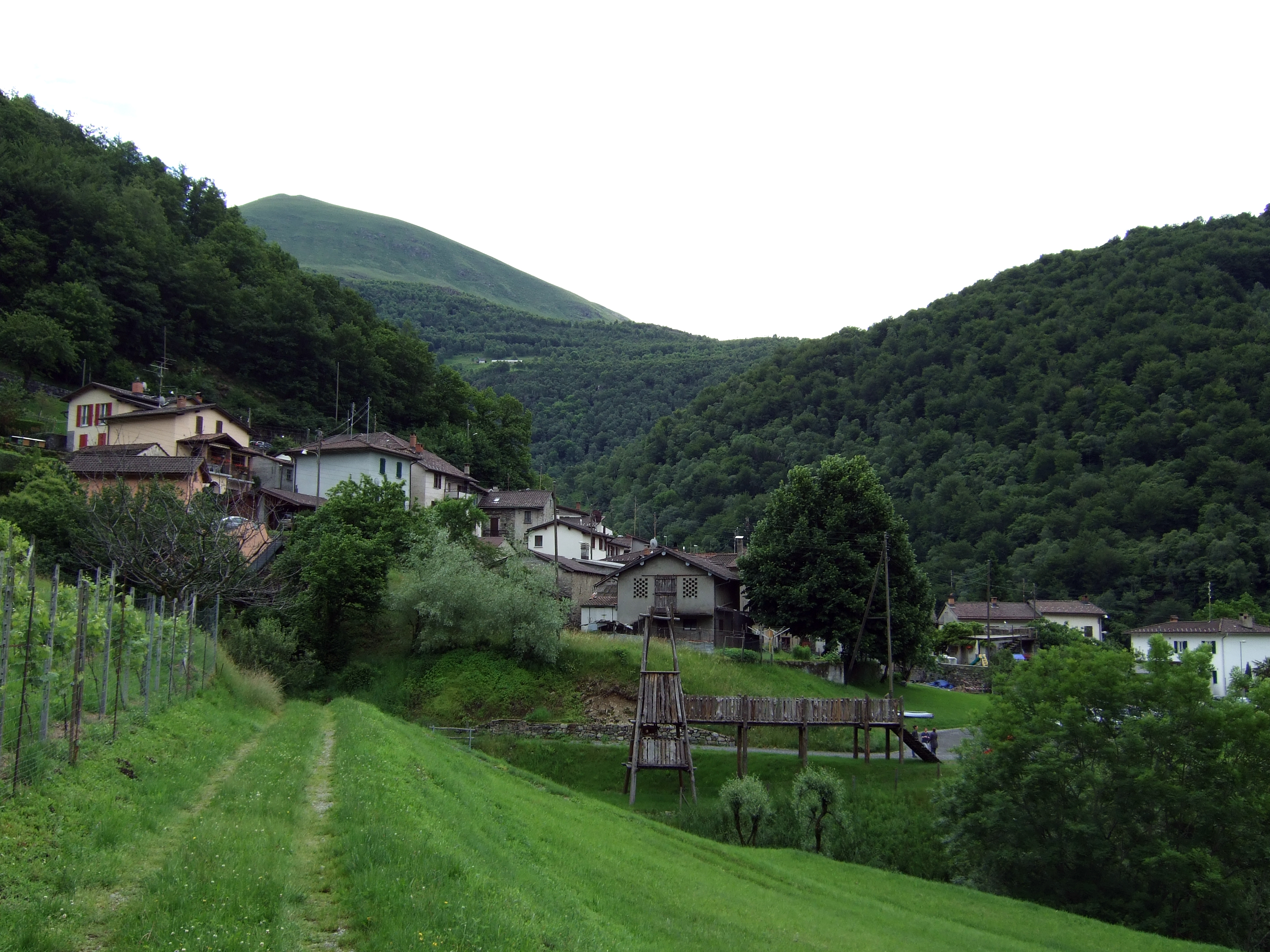
Medeglia village

During the High Middle Ages, Medeglia was probably part of the old valley community of Carvina which eventually came under the authority of Lugano. In 1501-03 Medeglia and Isone were transferred to the county of Bellinzona, but they remained part of the pieve of Agno. It became part of the parish of Bironico in the 13th century. Then, in 1585, it became the center of a vice parish. It finally broke away from the old parish and became a full parish in 1888. The parish church of St. Bartholomew was first mentioned in 1328. The romanesque core of the church was renovated and rebuilt in the 15th and 17th centuries.

The local economy of the village was based on animal husbandry and forestry. Starting in the 16th century the residents of Isone and Medeglia bought forests and pastures as far away as Robasacco, Contone, Cadenazzo, Sant'Antonino and Camorino while at the same time opening up trade relations with Bellinzona. To escape poverty and limited farm land, in the 19th century many inhabitants emigrated. The majority of these emigrants moved to Argentina and California. The mountain pastures of Medeglia were classified in 1996 as a wetland of national importance. In 2000, three-quarters of the working population worked outside the municipality.

=== Bironico ===
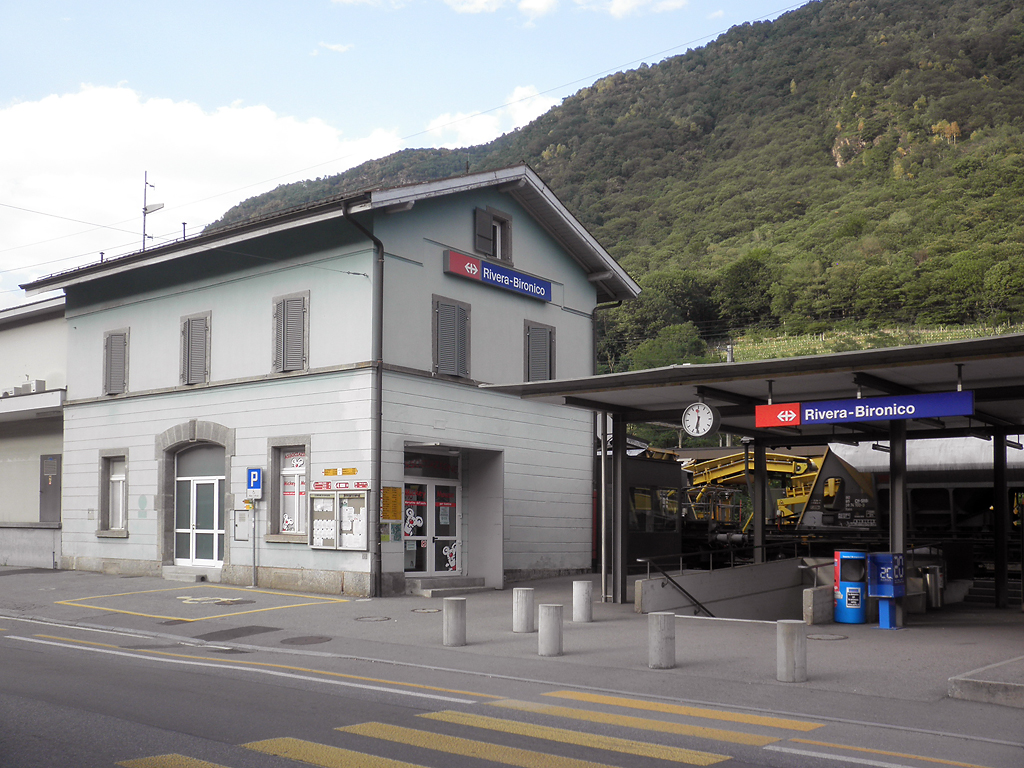
Rivera-Bironico train station

By 1000, Bironico was the secular and religious center of the Carvina region, which included the middle and upper Vedeggio valley. In the Early Middle Ages it was under the authority of the bishop of Como. Eventually the rights to over the village were acquired by the city of Como. At the end of the 13th century, the Rusca, a noble family from Como, lived in the community. After living in the village for a time, them moved into Bironico Castle in 1328. They remained in the owners of the castle until 1416. After the Swiss Confederation invasion, Bironico became a local administrative center. Beginning in the 16th century, an inn at the bridge over the Leguana river served as a meeting place of the Confederation's ministers.

The parish church of St. Martin was first mentioned in 1267.

Historically, the local economy relied on traditional alpine agriculture. During the 19th century poverty and limited farm land encouraged many residents to emigrate. Today there is some industry in the village, but most workers commute to jobs in the lower Vedeggio valley, Lugano and Bellinzona.

=== Camignolo ===
In the Middle Ages Camignolo was part of the parish of Bironico and valley community of Valle Carvina. One of the major landholders in the village was the Como Cathedral. The village was home to the San Ambrogio castle by 1348. Very little is known about the castle, but it was probably destroyed by the Swiss Confederation in the 16th century.

It became a vice-parish under Bironico in 1670, and then broke away to become a full parish in 1809. The parish church of S. Pietro e Paolo is first mentioned in the 15th century. It was rebuilt to its current appearance in 1670. The chapel of St. Ambrogio was probably built in the 10th century, but it first appears in records from 1348. The interior of the chapel is richly decorated with 15th century and late Romanesque frescoes. It was restored in 1976-79.

The village is still mostly agrarian though there has been some industrialization. Like other communities in the valley, during the 19th century many residents emigrated to escape the poverty and limited farm land. It has slowly developed into a minor regional center and a secondary school was built in the village.

=== Rivera ===
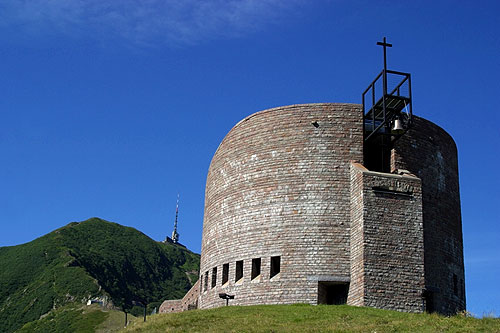
The church of Santa Maria degli Angeli was built on the Alpa Foppa meadow above Riveria.

The oldest traces of a settlement in the area include scattered artifacts and graves from the Iron Age and the Roman era. In the Middle Ages, Rivera was part of the valley community of Carvina. In the 13th century Como Cathedral possessed estates in Sorencino. Starting in 1678, representatives from the twelve members of the Swiss Confederation in Ticino met in Casa dei landfogti before they assembled in Lugano.

Rivera was a member of the parish of Bironico, before it became an independent parish in 1754. From 1779 until 1793, the parish church of S. Spirito was rebuilt.

The villagers earned their living from agriculture, mostly through traditional alpine farming and herding. During construction of the Ceneri tunnel in 1872-82, the population increased sharply. The completion of the road in 1811 and the construction of the tunnel and the station led to the emergence of a new district in the flatter part of the valley. This area forms the northern boundary of the agglomeration of Lugano. The base station of the Monte Tamaro gondola opened in 1972 in Rivera.

=== Sigirino ===
In the Middle Ages, Sigirino belonged to the territory of the Carvina valley community. In a land register of 1296, Como Cathedral was the major landholder in Sigirino. It is likely that at that time Sigirino possessed some type of fortifications.

The Church of St. Andrew was first mentioned in 1296. It was totally rebuilt in the 16th century and restored in the 18th. After its separation from the Bironico parish in 1625, Sigirino had its own parish.

== Geography ==
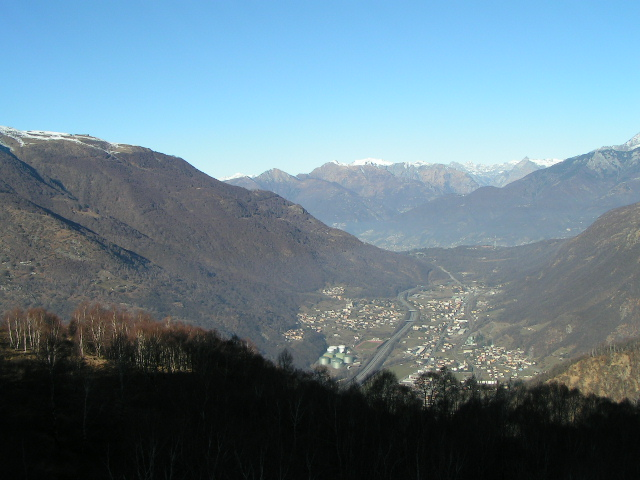
View down Monte Ceneri pass

Monteceneri had an area (as of the 2004/09 survey) of 36.08 km^{2} (13.93 sq mi). Of this area, about 8.5% is used for agricultural purposes, while 77.3% is forested. Of the rest of the land, 9.0% is settled (buildings or roads) and 5.2% is unproductive land. Over the past two decades (1979/85-2004/09) the amount of land that is settled has increased by 76 ha (190 acres) and the agricultural land has decreased by 192 ha (470 acres).

== Demographics ==
Monteceneri has a population (as of December 2020) of 4,535. As of 2013, 23.8% of the population are resident foreign nationals. Over the last 3 years (2010-2013) the population has changed at a rate of 11.03%. The birth rate in the municipality, in 2013, was 10.3 while the death rate was 6.7 per thousand residents.

As of 2013, children and teenagers (0–19 years old) make up 19.2% of the population, while adults (20–64 years old) are 65.8% and seniors (over 64 years old) make up 14.9%.

== Historic Population ==
The historical population is given in the following chart:

== Heritage sites of national significance ==
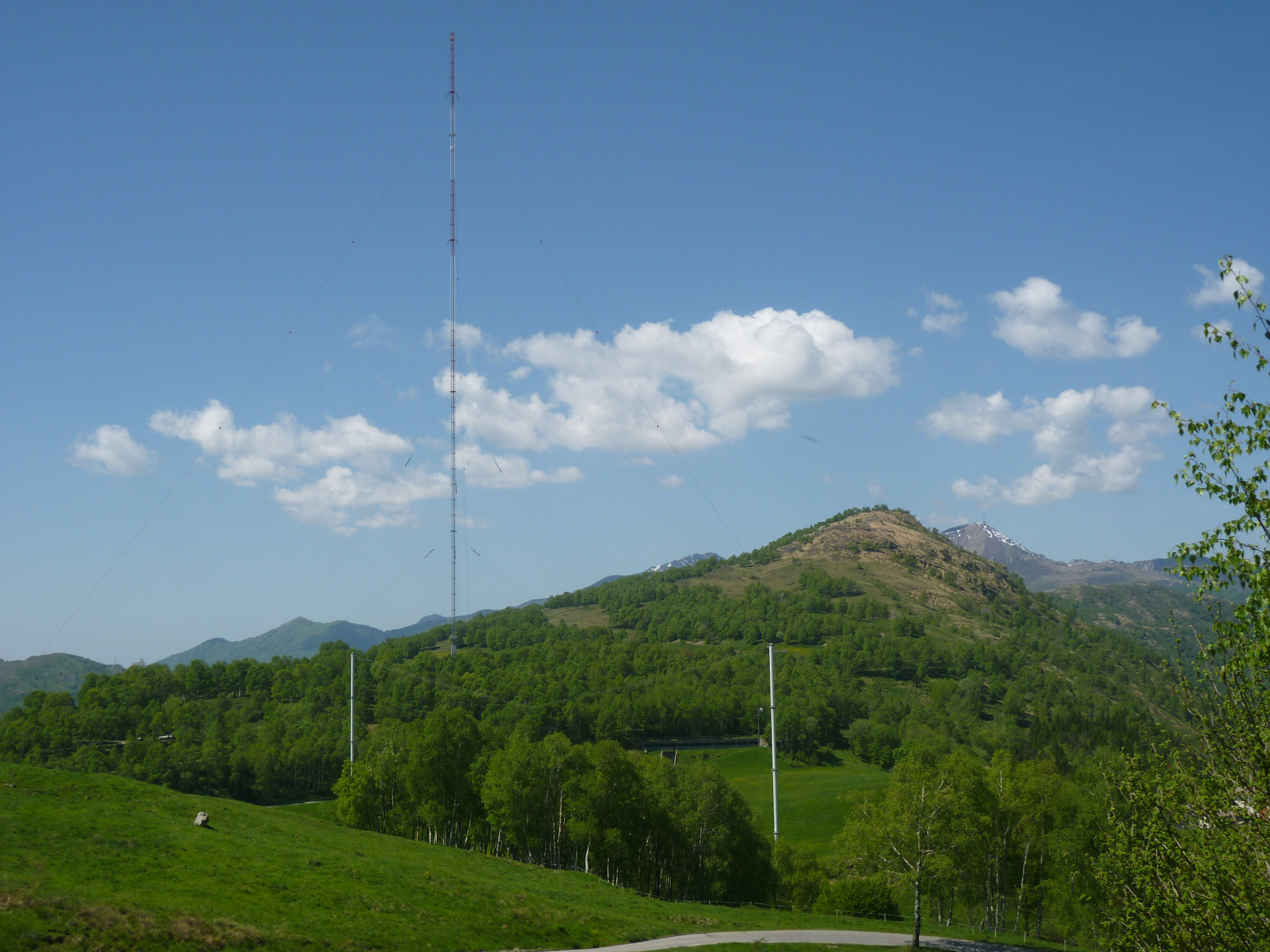
Radio tower on Monte Ceneri

The Ruderi Del Castello Di S. Sofia and Stazione Radio Monte Ceneri are listed as Swiss heritage site of national significance. The entire village of Osignano is designated as part of the Inventory of Swiss Heritage Sites.

== Economy ==
As of 2012, there were a total of 2,119 people employed in the municipality. Of these, a total of 26 people worked in 16 businesses in the primary economic sector. The secondary sector employed 664 workers in 78 separate businesses. Finally, the tertiary sector provided 1,429 jobs in 258 businesses. In 2013 a total of 6.1% of the population received social assistance.

== Politics ==
In the 2011 federal election the most popular party was the FDP with 32.8% of the vote. The next three most popular parties were the CVP (21.2%), the Lega party (16.0%) and the SVP (12.0%). In the federal election, a total of 1615 votes were cast, and the voter turnout was 59.7%.

== Crime ==
In 2014 the crime rate, of the over 200 crimes listed in the Swiss Criminal Code (running from murder, robbery and assault to accepting bribes and election fraud), in Monteceneri was 55 per thousand residents, slightly lower than the national average (64.6 per thousand). During the same period, the rate of drug crimes was 6 per thousand residents, which is only 60.6% of the national rate. The rate of violations of immigration, visa and work permit laws was 4.4 per thousand residents. This rate is slightly lower than the national average.

== Transport ==
Monteceneri is served by the Rivera-Bironico station, situated within the municipality. The station is on the Gotthard railway.

== Climate ==
Bironico has a Continental Subarctic climate (Dfc) under the Köppen climate classification. The average annual temperature is 11 °C (51 °F). The average coldest month was January with an average temperature of 2 °C (35 °F), while the warmest month was July with an average temperature of 21 °C (69 °F). The wettest month was May during which time Bironico received an average of 190 millimeters (7.6 in) of rain or snow. The driest month was February during which time Bironico received an average of 64 millimeters (2.5 in) of rain or snow.

Climate data for Bironico
Month	Jan	Feb	Mar	Apr	May	Jun	Jul	Aug	Sep	Oct	Nov	Dec	Year
Daily mean °C (°F)	2 (35)	4 (39)	7 (44)	11 (51)	15 (59)	18 (64)	21 (69)	20 (68)	17 (62)	12 (53)	7 (44)	3 (37)	11 (51)
Average precipitation mm (inches)	69 (2.7)	64 (2.5)	110 (4.4)	150 (6)	190 (7.6)	190 (7.3)	160 (6.3)	180 (7.1)	180 (7)	180 (7.1)	140 (5.5)	79 (3.1)	1,690 (66.4)
