= Rivera, Switzerland =

Rivera
- Former municipality
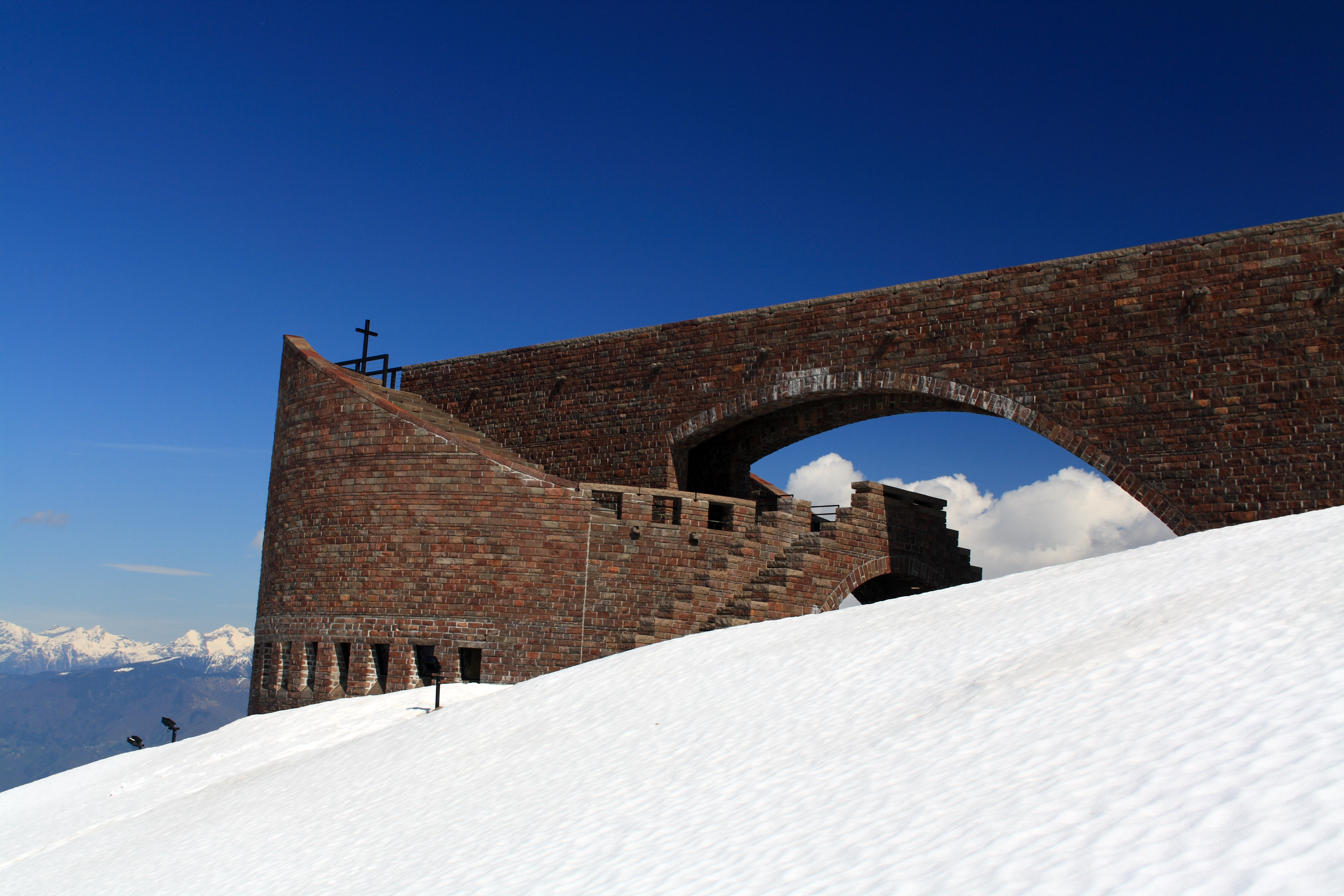
- Santa Maria degli Angeli above Rivera village

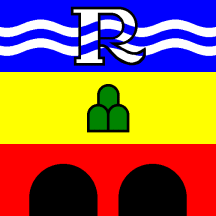
- Flag Coat of arms
- Location of Rivera
- Location within Switzerland Location within Canton of Ticino
- Coordinates: 46°6′N 8°56′E
- Country: Switzerland
- Canton: Ticino
- District: Lugano

Area
  - Total: 13.35 km^{2} (5.15 sq mi)
- Elevation: 554 m (1,818 ft)

Population (December 2004)
  - Total: 1,462
  - Density: 109.5/km^{2} (283.6/sq mi)
- Time zone: UTC+01:00 (CET)
  - Summer (DST): UTC+02:00 (CEST)
- Postal code: 6802
- SFOS number: 5217
- ISO 3166 code: CH-TI
- Surrounded by: Bironico, Cadenazzo, Camignolo, Contone, Magadino, Mezzovico-Vira, Sigirino, Vira (Gambarogno)
- Website: www.comunerivera.ch

Rivera is a former municipality in the district of Lugano in the canton of Ticino in Switzerland. The municipalities of Medeglia, Bironico, Camignolo, Rivera and Sigirino merged on 21 November 2010 into the new municipality of Monteceneri.

== History ==
Rivera is first mentioned in 1296 as Sorenzino. In 1348 it was mentioned as Rivera.

Archeological objects and graves from the Iron Age and the Roman era have been found in Rivera. In the Middle Ages, Rivera was part of the valley community of Carvina. In the 13th century Como Cathedral possessed estates in Sorencino. Starting in 1678, representatives from the twelve members of the Swiss Confederation in Ticino met in Casa dei landfogti before they assembled in Lugano.

Rivera was a member of the parish of Bironico, before it became an independent parish in 1754. From 1779 until 1793, the parish church of S. Spirito was rebuilt.

The villagers earned their living from agriculture, mostly in alpine meadows and pastures. During construction of the Ceneri tunnel in 1872–82, the population increased sharply. The completion of the road in 1811 and the construction of the tunnel and the station led to the emergence of a new district in the flatter part of the valley. This area forms the northern boundary of the agglomeration of Lugano. The base station of the Monte Tamaro gondola opened in 1972 in Rivera.

== Geography ==
Aerial view (1962)

Rivera has an area, as of 1997, of 13.35 square kilometers (5.15 sq mi). Of this area, 0.95 km^{2} (0.37 sq mi) or 7.1% is used for agricultural purposes, while 10.17 km^{2} (3.93 sq mi) or 76.2% is forested. Of the rest of the land, 1.38 km^{2} (0.53 sq mi) or 10.3% is settled (buildings or roads), 0.08 km^{2} (20 acres) or 0.6% is either rivers or lakes and 0.71 km^{2} (0.27 sq mi) or 5.3% is unproductive land.

Of the built up area, housing and buildings made up 3.7% and transportation infrastructure made up 4.5%. Out of the forested land, 64.6% of the total land area is heavily forested and 2.2% is covered with orchards or small clusters of trees. Of the agricultural land, 3.1% is used for growing crops and 3.7% is used for alpine pastures. All the water in the municipality is flowing water. Of the unproductive areas, 4.6% is unproductive vegetation.

The village is located in the Lugano district, in the upper Vedeggio valley along the old main road. It consists of the village of Rivera and the hamlets of Soresina, Sorencino and Capidogno.

== Coat of arms ==
The blazon of the municipal coat of arms is Tierced per fess first azure two bendlets wavy argent overall a letter R counterchanged second or coupeaux vert and third gules two tunnel holes sable issuant from base. The coat of arms is fairly recent, being adopted in 1952. The top portion of the coat of arms represents the radio waves from Radio Svizzera Italiana on Monte Ceneri. Monte Ceneri is represented by the middle section. The black arcades represent the tunnels connecting both parts of Ticino, the Sopraceneri and Sottoceneri (over and under the Mount Ceneri).

== Demographics ==
Rivera has a population (As of December 2004) of 1,462. As of 2008, 20.3% of the population are resident foreign nationals. Over the last 10 years (1997-2007) the population has changed at a rate of 6.4%.

Most of the population (as of 2000) speaks Italian (88.6%), with German being second most common (4.8%) and Serbo-Croatian being third (2.2%). Of the Swiss national languages (as of 2000), 68 speak German, 28 people speak French, 1,253 people speak Italian. The remainder (66 people) speak another language.

As of 2008, the gender distribution of the population was 49.2% male and 50.8% female. The population was made up of 613 Swiss men (38.5% of the population), and 172 (10.8%) non-Swiss men. There were 660 Swiss women (41.4%), and 149 (9.3%) non-Swiss women.

In 2008 there were 16 live births to Swiss citizens and 6 births to non-Swiss citizens, and in same time span there were 7 deaths of Swiss citizens and 1 non-Swiss citizen death. Ignoring immigration and emigration, the population of Swiss citizens increased by 9 while the foreign population increased by 5. There were 2 Swiss men who immigrated back to Switzerland and 2 Swiss women who emigrated from Switzerland. At the same time, there were 2 non-Swiss men who immigrated from another country to Switzerland. The total Swiss population change in 2008 (from all sources, including moves across municipal borders) was an increase of 44 and the non-Swiss population change was an increase of 7 people. This represents a population growth rate of 3.3%.

The age distribution, as of 2009, in Rivera is; 146 children or 9.2% of the population are between 0 and 9 years old and 153 teenagers or 9.6% are between 10 and 19. Of the adult population, 217 people or 13.6% of the population are between 20 and 29 years old. 227 people or 14.2% are between 30 and 39, 286 people or 17.9% are between 40 and 49, and 231 people or 14.5% are between 50 and 59. The senior population distribution is 155 people or 9.7% of the population are between 60 and 69 years old, 110 people or 6.9% are between 70 and 79, there are 69 people or 4.3% who are over 80.

As of 2000 the average number of residents per living room was 0.61 which is about equal to the cantonal average of 0.6 per room. In this case, a room is defined as space of a housing unit of at least 4 m^{2} (43 sq ft) as normal bedrooms, dining rooms, living rooms, kitchens and habitable cellars and attics. About 45.3% of the total households were owner occupied, or in other words did not pay rent (though they may have a mortgage or a rent-to-own agreement).

As of 2000, there were 581 private households in the village, and an average of 2.4 persons per household. In 2000 there were 294 single family homes (or 68.4% of the total) out of a total of 430 inhabited buildings. There were 76 two family buildings (17.7%) and 23 multi-family buildings (5.3%). There were also 37 buildings in the village that were multipurpose buildings (used for both housing and commercial or another purpose).

The vacancy rate for the village, in 2008, was 0.14%. In 2000 there were 649 apartments in the village. The most common apartment size was the 4 room apartment of which there were 217. There were 30 single room apartments and 178 apartments with five or more rooms. Of these apartments, a total of 574 apartments (88.4% of the total) were permanently occupied, while 49 apartments (7.6%) were seasonally occupied and 26 apartments (4.0%) were empty. As of 2007, the construction rate of new housing units was 5.2 new units per 1000 residents.

The historical population is given in the following chart:

== Heritage sites of national significance ==
The Stazione Radio Monte Ceneri (shared with Bironico) is listed as a Swiss heritage site of national significance.

== Politics ==
In the 2007 federal election the most popular party was the FDP which received 38.07% of the vote. The next three most popular parties were the CVP (21.28%), the Ticino League (13.43%) and the SVP (11.87%). In the federal election, a total of 520 votes were cast, and the voter turnout was 51.5%.

In the 2007 Gran Consiglio election, there were a total of 1,022 registered voters in Rivera, of which 722 or 70.6% voted. 22 blank ballots and 4 null ballots were cast, leaving 696 valid ballots in the election. The most popular party was the PLRT which received 251 or 36.1% of the vote. The next three most popular parties were; the PPD+GenGiova (with 131 or 18.8%), the LEGA (with 98 or 14.1%) and the SSI (with 88 or 12.6%).

In the 2007 Consiglio di Stato election, 8 blank ballots and 1 null ballot were cast, leaving 713 valid ballots in the election. The most popular party was the PLRT which received 234 or 32.8% of the vote. The next three most popular parties were; the LEGA (with 145 or 20.3%), the PPD (with 134 or 18.8%) and the PS (with 95 or 13.3%).

== Economy ==
As of 2007, Rivera had an unemployment rate of 4.01%. As of 2005, there were 12 people employed in the primary economic sector and about 5 businesses involved in this sector. 277 people were employed in the secondary sector and there were 24 businesses in this sector. 540 people were employed in the tertiary sector, with 84 businesses in this sector. There were 685 residents of the village who were employed in some capacity, of which females made up 38.5% of the workforce.

In 2000, there were 937 workers who commuted into the village and 445 workers who commuted away. The village is a net importer of workers, with about 2.1 workers entering the village for every one leaving. About 18.8% of the workforce coming into Rivera are coming from outside Switzerland. Of the working population, 10.2% used public transportation to get to work, and 65.4% used a private car.

As of 2009, there were 4 hotels in Rivera with a total of 33 rooms and 65 beds.

== Religion ==
From the 2000 census, 1,162 or 82.1% were Roman Catholic, while 72 or 5.1% belonged to the Swiss Reformed Church. There are 125 individuals (or about 8.83% of the population) who belong to another church (not listed on the census), and 56 individuals (or about 3.96% of the population) did not answer the question.

== Education ==
In Rivera about 63.5% of the population (between age 25 and 64) have completed either non-mandatory upper secondary education or additional higher education (either University or a Fachhochschule).

In Rivera there were a total of 246 students (as of 2009). The Ticino education system provides up to three years of non-mandatory kindergarten and in Rivera there were 35 children in kindergarten. The primary school program lasts for five years and includes both a standard school and a special school. In the village, 72 students attended the standard primary schools and 2 students attended the special school. In the lower secondary school system, students either attend a two-year middle school followed by a two-year pre-apprenticeship or they attend a four-year program to prepare for higher education. There were 67 students in the two-year middle school, while 21 students were in the four-year advanced program.

The upper secondary school includes several options, but at the end of the upper secondary program, a student will be prepared to enter a trade or to continue on to a university or college. In Ticino, vocational students may either attend school while working on their internship or apprenticeship (which takes three or four years) or may attend school followed by an internship or apprenticeship (which takes one year as a full-time student or one and a half to two years as a part-time student). There were 15 vocational students who were attending school full-time and 32 who attend part-time.

The professional program lasts three years and prepares a student for a job in engineering, nursing, computer science, business, tourism and similar fields. There were 2 students in the professional program.

As of 2000, there were 44 students in Rivera who came from another village, while 155 residents attended schools outside the village.

== Transport ==
Rivera is served by the nearby Rivera-Bironico station, on the Gotthard railway.
