= Camignolo =

- Former municipality
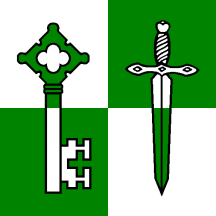
- Flag Coat of arms
- Location of Camignolo
- Location within Switzerland Location within Canton of Ticino
- Coordinates: 46°6′N 8°56′E
- Country: Switzerland
- Canton: Ticino
- District: Lugano

Area
  - Total: 4.53 km^{2} (1.75 sq mi)
- Elevation: 449 m (1,473 ft)

Population (December 2004)
  - Total: 664
  - Density: 147/km^{2} (380/sq mi)
- Time zone: UTC+01:00 (CET)
  - Summer (DST): UTC+02:00 (CEST)
- Postal code: 6803
- SFOS number: 5165
- ISO 3166 code: CH-TI
- Surrounded by: Bironico, Capriasca, Lugaggia, Medeglia, Mezzovico-Vira, Rivera
- Website: SFSO statistics

Camignolo is a former municipality in the district of Lugano in the canton of Ticino in Switzerland. The municipalities of Medeglia, Bironico, Camignolo, Rivera and Sigirino merged on 21 November 2010 into the new municipality of Monteceneri.

== History ==
Camignolo is first mentioned in 1296 as Camigiollo. In the Middle Ages Camignolo appears as part of the parish of Bironico and valley community of Valle Carvina. Como Cathedral had properties in the village. San Ambrogio castle is mentioned in 1348. It was probably destroyed around the beginning of Swiss Confederation rule in the 16th century.

It was a vice-parish in 1670, and became a full parish in 1809. The parish church of S. Pietro e Paolo is first mentioned in the 15th century. Its present form comes from a reconstruction in 1670. The 10th century chapel of S. Ambrogio (first mentioned in 1348) is rich in frescoes from the late Romanesque and the 15th century. It was restored in 1976–79.

The inhabitants are still mainly employed in agriculture, though there was constant, large-scale emigration before the industrialization of the valley. Only in recent decades, has there been was a modest development in construction, industry and trade. Camignolo is the seat of a secondary school.

== Geography ==
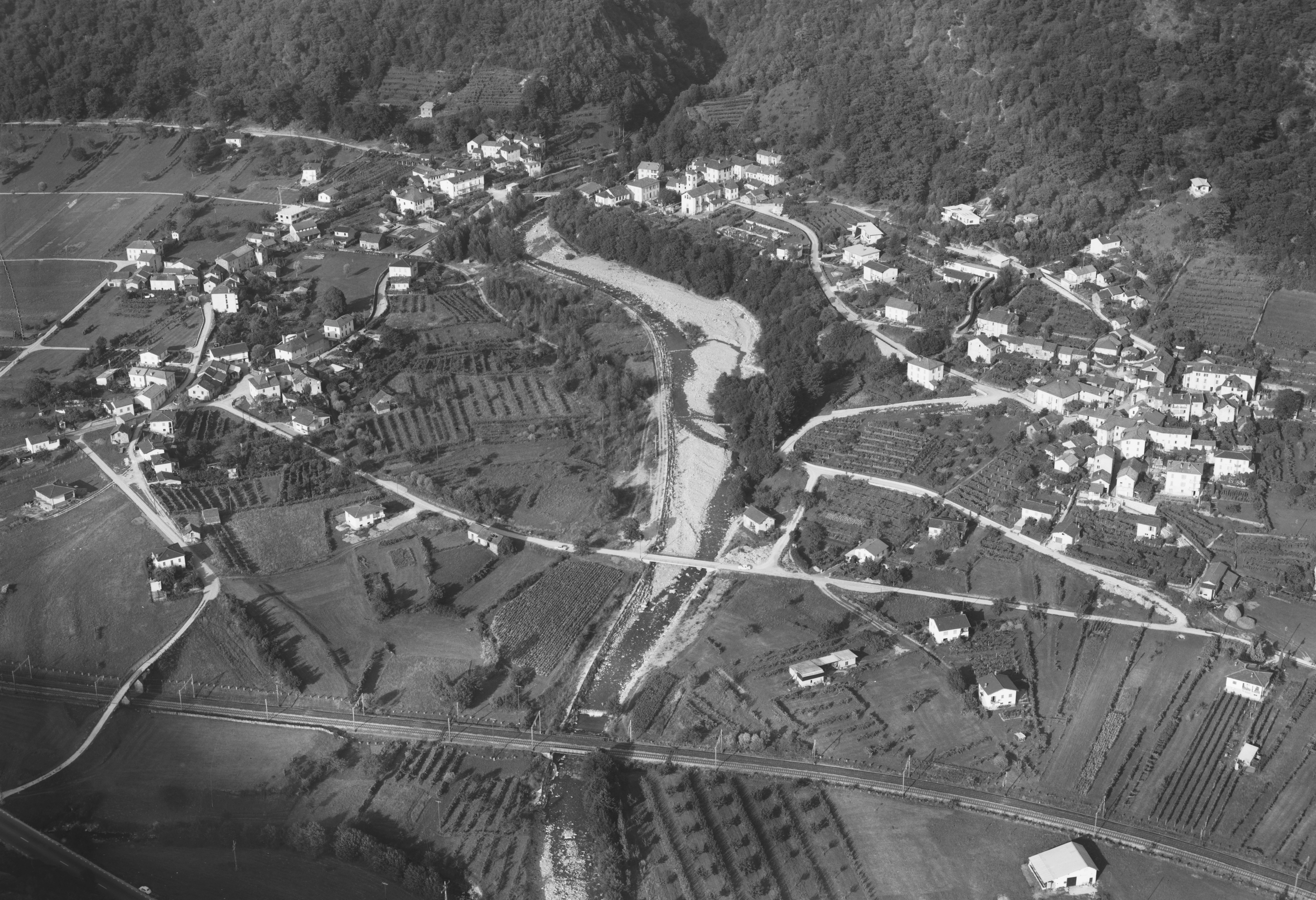
Aerial view (1964)

Camignolo has an area, as of 1997, of 4.53 square kilometers (1.75 sq mi). Of this area, 0.44 km^{2} (0.17 sq mi) or 9.7% is used for agricultural purposes, while 3.25 km^{2} (1.25 sq mi) or 71.7% is forested. Of the rest of the land, 0.33 km^{2} (0.13 sq mi) or 7.3% is settled (buildings or roads), 0.06 km^{2} (15 acres) or 1.3% is either rivers or lakes and 0.32 km^{2} (0.12 sq mi) or 7.1% is unproductive land.

Of the built up area, housing and buildings made up 4.4% and transportation infrastructure made up 2.2%. Out of the forested land, 66.4% of the total land area is heavily forested and 2.6% is covered with orchards or small clusters of trees. Of the agricultural land, 4.4% is used for growing crops and 4.4% is used for alpine pastures. All the water in the municipality is flowing water.

The village is located in the Lugano district, around a bridge over the Vedeggio at the end of the Valle d'Isone. The municipality stretches from the left side of the valley to Gola di Lago and includes the alpine pasture, Alp Santa Maria in Lago.

== Coat of arms ==
The blazon of the municipal coat of arms is Quartered argent and vert a key and a sword counterchanged both palewise.

== Demographics ==
Camignolo has a population (As of December 2004) of 664. As of 2008, 8.6% of the population are resident foreign nationals. Over the last 10 years (1997-2007) the population has changed at a rate of 20.3%.

Most of the population (as of 2000) speaks Italian (91.6%), with German being second most common (5.2%) and French being third (1.8%). Of the Swiss national languages (as of 2000), 31 speak German, 11 people speak French, 546 people speak Italian. The remainder (8 people) speak another language.

As of 2008, the gender distribution of the population was 50.1% male and 49.9% female. The population was made up of 336 Swiss men (45.8% of the population), and 31 (4.2%) non-Swiss men. There were 341 Swiss women (46.5%), and 25 (3.4%) non-Swiss women.

In 2008 there were 10 live births to Swiss citizens and were 3 deaths of Swiss citizens and 1 non-Swiss citizen death. Ignoring immigration and emigration, the population of Swiss citizens increased by 7 while the foreign population decreased by 1. There were 2 Swiss men and 4 Swiss women who emigrated from Switzerland. At the same time, there was 1 non-Swiss man who emigrated from Switzerland to another country and 1 non-Swiss woman who immigrated from another country to Switzerland. The total Swiss population change in 2008 (from all sources, including moves across municipal borders) was an increase of 6 and the non-Swiss population change was an increase of 6 people. This represents a population growth rate of 1.6%.

The age distribution, as of 2009, in Camignolo is; 90 children or 12.3% of the population are between 0 and 9 years old and 79 teenagers or 10.8% are between 10 and 19. Of the adult population, 57 people or 7.8% of the population are between 20 and 29 years old. 128 people or 17.5% are between 30 and 39, 111 people or 15.1% are between 40 and 49, and 93 people or 12.7% are between 50 and 59. The senior population distribution is 94 people or 12.8% of the population are between 60 and 69 years old, 48 people or 6.5% are between 70 and 79, there are 33 people or 4.5% who are over 80.

As of 2000 the average number of residents per living room was 0.58 which is about equal to the cantonal average of 0.6 per room. In this case, a room is defined as space of a housing unit of at least 4 m^{2} (43 sq ft) as normal bedrooms, dining rooms, living rooms, kitchens and habitable cellars and attics. About 66.2% of the total households were owner occupied, or in other words did not pay rent (though they may have a mortgage or a rent-to-own agreement).

As of 2000, there were 237 private households in the village, and an average of 2.5 persons per household. In 2000 there were 203 single family homes (or 78.7% of the total) out of a total of 258 inhabited buildings. There were 34 two family buildings (13.2%) and 7 multi-family buildings (2.7%). There were also 14 buildings in the village that were multipurpose buildings (used for both housing and commercial or another purpose).

The vacancy rate for the village, in 2008, was 0%. In 2000 there were 297 apartments in the village. The most common apartment size was the 5 room apartment of which there were 100. There were 11 single room apartments and 100 apartments with five or more rooms. Of these apartments, a total of 237 apartments (79.8% of the total) were permanently occupied, while 59 apartments (19.9%) were seasonally occupied and 1 apartments (0.3%) were empty. As of 2007, the construction rate of new housing units was 10.8 new units per 1000 residents.

The historical population is given in the following chart:

== Politics ==
In the 2007 federal election the most popular party was the CVP which received 37.2% of the vote. The next three most popular parties were the SP (18.03%), the FDP (16.41%) and the Ticino League (13.76%). In the federal election, a total of 269 votes were cast, and the voter turnout was 51.1%.

In the 2007 Gran Consiglio election, there were a total of 521 registered voters in Camignolo, of which 354 or 67.9% voted. 10 blank ballots and 1 null ballot were cast, leaving 343 valid ballots in the election. The most popular party was the PPD+GenGiova which received 115 or 33.5% of the vote. The next three most popular parties were; the PLRT (with 59 or 17.2%), the LEGA (with 52 or 15.2%) and the PS (with 48 or 14.0%).

In the 2007 Consiglio di Stato election, 8 blank ballots and 1 null ballot were cast, leaving 345 valid ballots in the election. The most popular party was the PPD which received 114 or 33.0% of the vote. The next three most popular parties were; the LEGA (with 71 or 20.6%), the PLRT (with 59 or 17.1%) and the PS (with 50 or 14.5%).

== Economy ==
As of 2007, Camignolo had an unemployment rate of 3.07%. As of 2005, there were 2 people employed in the primary economic sector and about 2 businesses involved in this sector. 31 people were employed in the secondary sector and there were 10 businesses in this sector. 34 people were employed in the tertiary sector, with 9 businesses in this sector. There were 270 residents of the village who were employed in some capacity, of which females made up 32.6% of the workforce.

In 2000, there were 46 workers who commuted into the village and 199 workers who commuted away. The village is a net exporter of workers, with about 4.3 workers leaving the village for every one entering. Of the working population, 7.8% used public transportation to get to work, and 68.5% used a private car.

== Religion ==
From the 2000 census, 520 or 87.2% were Roman Catholic, while 35 or 5.9% belonged to the Swiss Reformed Church. There are 26 individuals (or about 4.36% of the population) who belong to another church (not listed on the census), and 15 individuals (or about 2.52% of the population) did not answer the question.

== Education ==
In Camignolo about 71.9% of the population (between age 25 and 64) have completed either non-mandatory upper secondary education or additional higher education (either University or a Fachhochschule).

In Camignolo there were a total of 146 students (as of 2009). The Ticino education system provides up to three years of non-mandatory kindergarten and in Camignolo there were 20 children in kindergarten. The primary school program lasts for five years and includes both a standard school and a special school. In the village, 52 students attended the standard primary schools and 3 students attended the special school. In the lower secondary school system, students either attend a two-year middle school followed by a two-year pre-apprenticeship or they attend a four-year program to prepare for higher education. There were 41 students in the two-year middle school, while 17 students were in the four-year advanced program.

The upper secondary school includes several options, but at the end of the upper secondary program, a student will be prepared to enter a trade or to continue on to a university or college. In Ticino, vocational students may either attend school while working on their internship or apprenticeship (which takes three or four years) or may attend school followed by an internship or apprenticeship (which takes one year as a full-time student or one and a half to two years as a part-time student). There were 4 vocational students who were attending school full-time and 8 who attend part-time.

The professional program lasts three years and prepares a student for a job in engineering, nursing, computer science, business, tourism and similar fields. There was 1 student in the professional program.

As of 2000, there were 375 students in Camignolo who came from another village, while 22 residents attended schools outside the village.

== Notable people ==
- Giovanni Battista Belli-Bernasconi (1770 in Camignolo – 1827) a Russian architect of many classical buildings and architectural ensembles in Saint Petersburg and its surroundings
