= Serravalle Castle =

Castle in Serravalle, Switzerland

- Serravalle
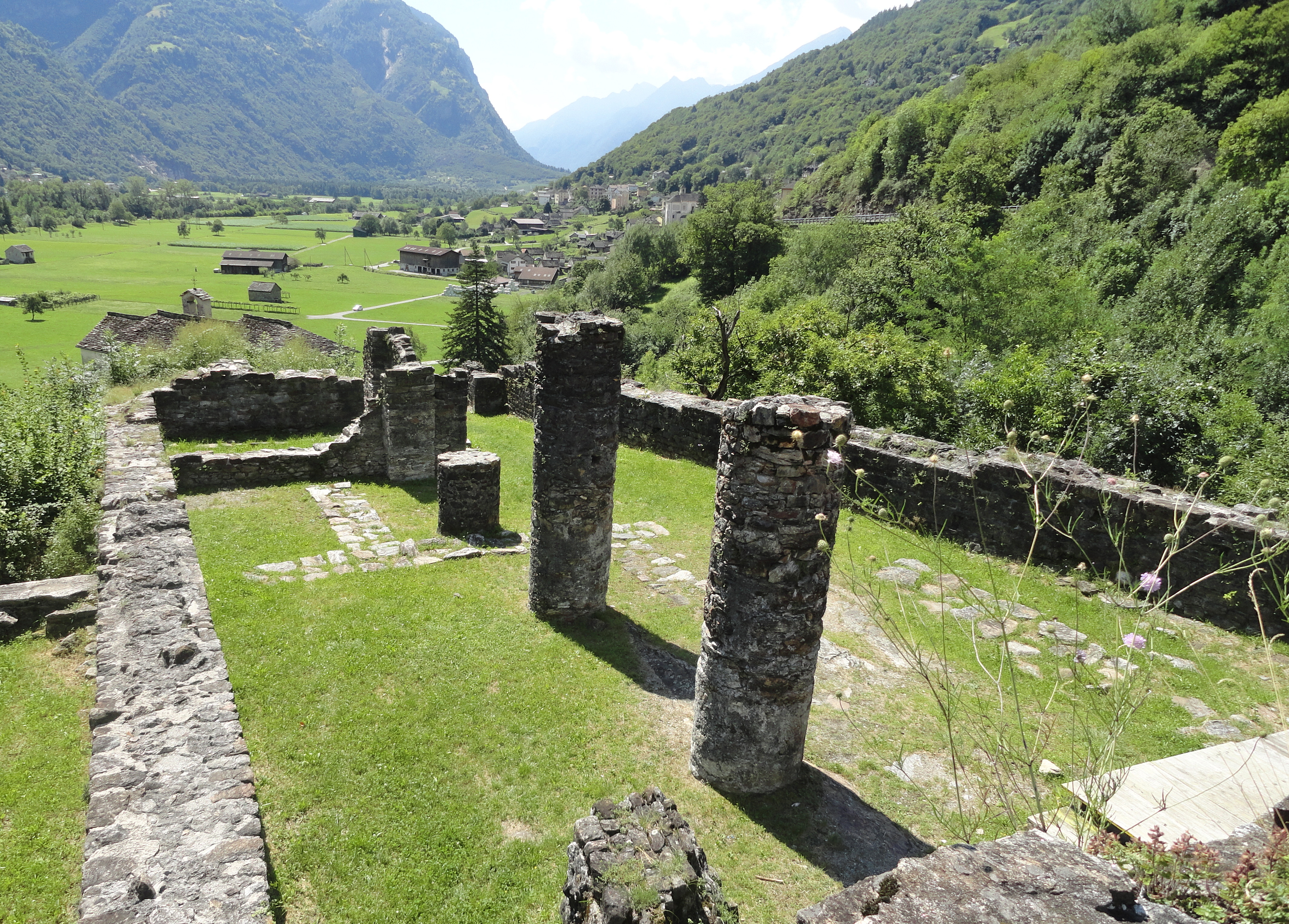
- Ruins of the main hall with pillars visible

Site information
- Type: hill castle
- Code: CH-TI
- Condition: ruin

Location
- Coordinates: 46°24′46.10″N 8°58′20.8″E
- Height: 391 m above the sea

Site history
- Built: 12th century
- Materials: Granite rubble stone

Serravalle Castle is a ruined castle in the municipality of Serravalle of the Canton of Ticino in Switzerland. It is a Swiss heritage site of national significance.

== See also ==
- List of castles in Switzerland
