= Medeglia =

- Former municipality
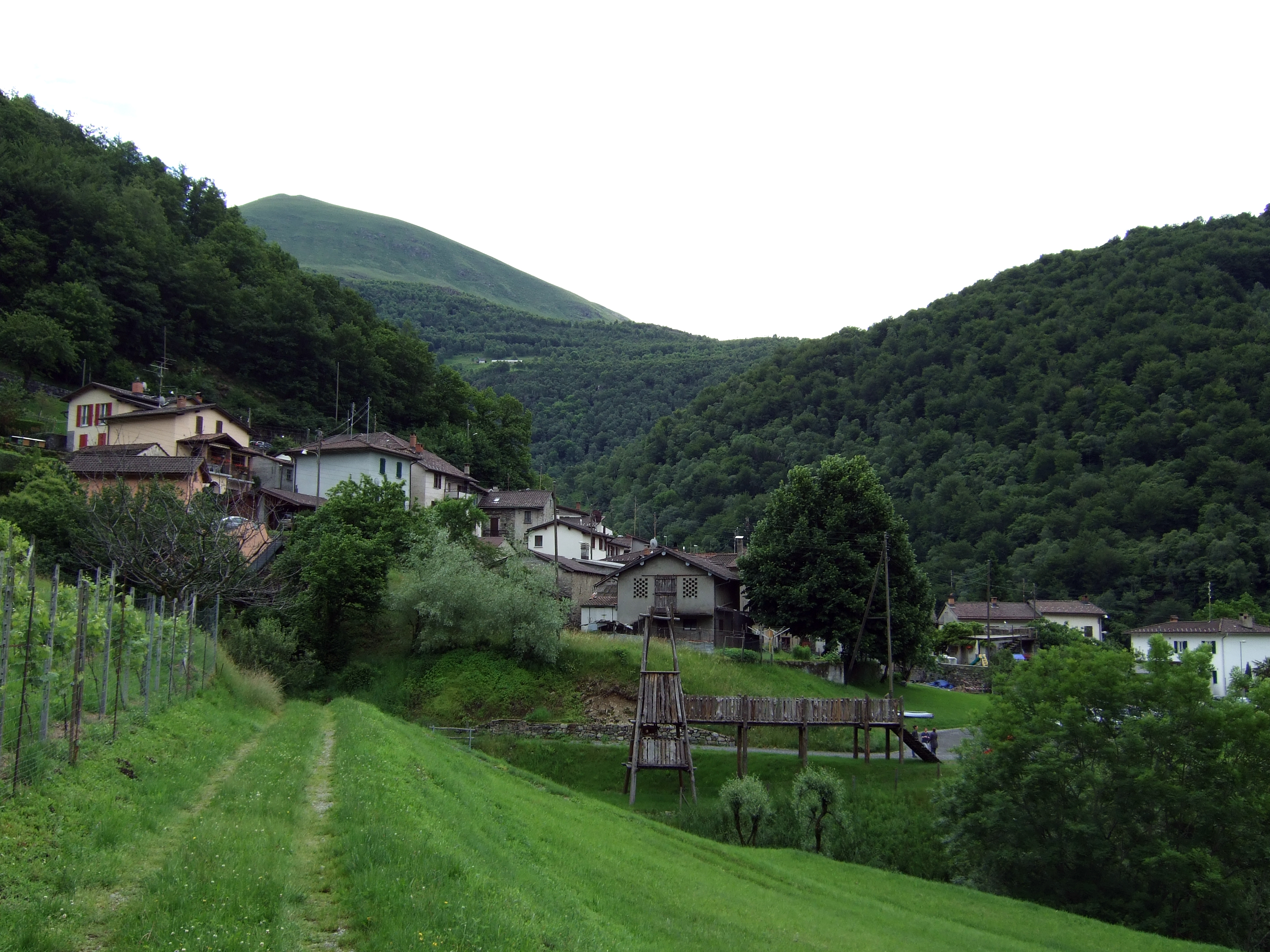
- Medeglia village

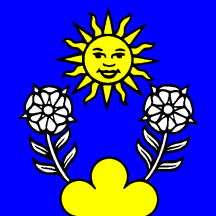
- Flag Coat of arms
- Location of Medeglia
- Location within Switzerland Location within Canton of Ticino
- Coordinates: 46°07′N 8°58′E
- Country: Switzerland
- Canton: Ticino
- District: Bellinzona

Area
  - Total: 6.27 km^{2} (2.42 sq mi)
- Elevation: 714 m (2,343 ft)

Population (December 2004)
  - Total: 355
  - Density: 56.6/km^{2} (147/sq mi)
- Time zone: UTC+01:00 (CET)
  - Summer (DST): UTC+02:00 (CEST)
- Postal code: 6809
- SFOS number: 5011
- ISO 3166 code: CH-TI
- Surrounded by: Bironico, Cadenazzo, Camignolo, Camorino, Capriasca, Isone, Pianezzo, Ponte Capriasca, Sant'Antonio
- Website: SFSO statistics

Medeglia is a village and a former municipality in the district of Bellinzona in the canton of Ticino in Switzerland. On 21 November 2010, the former municipalities of Medeglia, Bironico, Camignolo, Rivera and Sigirino merged in the new municipality of Monteceneri.

== History ==
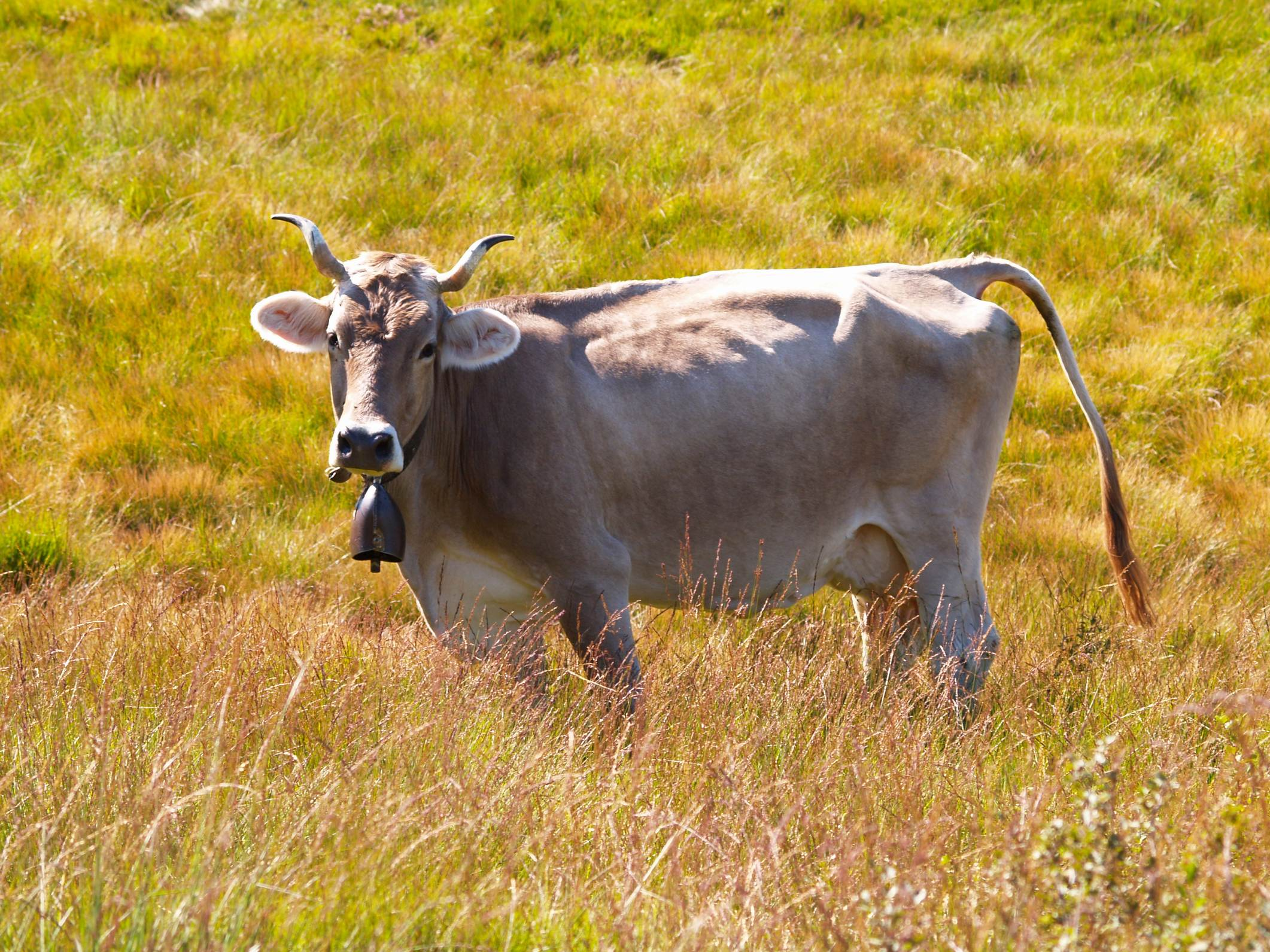
A cow in an alpine pasture near Medeglia

Medeglia is first mentioned in 1195 as Medellia. It can be assumed that in the High Middle Ages, Medeglia was part of the old valley community of Carvina. In 1501-03 changed area around Isone, Medeglia and Lugano became part of the county of Bellinzona, but remained in the Agno parish. It became part of the parish of Bironico in the 13th century. Then, in 1585, it broke away from that parish to become a vice parish. It was raised to a full parish in 1888. The parish church of St. Bartholomew was first mentioned in 1328. The romanesque core of the church was renovated and rebuilt in the 15th and 17th centuries.

The local economy of the village was based on animal husbandry and forestry. Starting in the 16th century the residents of Isone and Medeglia bought forests and pastures as far away as Robasacco, Contone, Cadenazzo, Sant'Antonino and Camorino while at the same time opening up trade relations with Bellinzona. In the 19th century, many inhabitants emigrated with the majority going to Argentina and California. The mountain pastures of Medeglia were classified in 1996 as a wetland of national importance. In 2000, three quarters of the working population worked outside the municipality.

== Geography ==
Medeglia has an area, as of 1997, of 6.27 square kilometers (2.42 sq mi). Of this area, 0.48 km^{2} (0.19 sq mi) or 7.7% is used for agricultural purposes, while 4.96 km^{2} (1.92 sq mi) or 79.1% is forested. Of the rest of the land, 0.24 km^{2} (0.093 sq mi) or 3.8% is settled (buildings or roads), 0.01 km^{2} (2.5 acres) or 0.2% is either rivers or lakes and 0.14 km^{2} (35 acres) or 2.2% is unproductive land.

Of the built up area, housing and buildings made up 2.7% and transportation infrastructure made up 1.1%. Out of the forested land, 71.0% of the total land area is heavily forested and 5.7% is covered with orchards or small clusters of trees. Of the agricultural land, 3.8% is used for growing crops, while 1.1% is used for orchards or vine crops and 2.7% is used for alpine pastures. All the water in the municipality is flowing water. Of the unproductive areas, 1.9% is unproductive vegetation and .

The municipality is located in the Bellinzona district, in the upper Vedeggio valley. It consists of the village of Medeglia and multiple hamlets including Drossa. Until 1805, the village of Robasacco (now part of Cadenazzo) belonged to Medeglia. The municipalities of Medeglia, Bironico, Camignolo, Rivera and Sigirino are seeking approval from the voters to merge on some time in the future into a new municipality which will be known as Monteceneri.

== Coat of arms ==
The blazon of the municipal coat of arms is Azure a Sun in her Splendour Or between two Roses Argent slipped growing from a Mount of 3 Coupeaux of the second.

== Demographics ==
Medeglia has a population (as of 2004) of 355. As of 2008, 5.7% of the population are foreign nationals. Over the last 10 years (1997-2007) the population has changed at a rate of -2%.

Most of the population (as of 2000) speaks Italian(89.4%), with German being second most common ( 4.8%) and French being third ( 2.4%). Of the Swiss national languages (as of 2000), 16 speak German, 8 people speak French, 295 people speak Italian. The remainder (11 people) speak another language.

As of 2008, the gender distribution of the population was 48.4% male and 51.6% female. The population was made up of 156 Swiss men (44.4% of the population), and 14 (4.0%) non-Swiss men. There were 173 Swiss women (49.3%), and 8 (2.3%) non-Swiss women.

In 2008 there were 4 live births to Swiss citizens and births to non-Swiss citizens, and in same time span there were 7 deaths of Swiss citizens. Ignoring immigration and emigration, the population of Swiss citizens decreased by 3 while the foreign population remained the same. At the same time, there was 1 non-Swiss man who immigrated from another country to Switzerland. The total Swiss population change in 2008 (from all sources) was an increase of 6 and the non-Swiss population change was an increase of 3 people. This represents a population growth rate of 2.6%.

The age distribution, as of 2009, in Medeglia is; 34 children or 9.7% of the population are between 0 and 9 years old and 23 teenagers or 6.6% are between 10 and 19. Of the adult population, 29 people or 8.3% of the population are between 20 and 29 years old. 48 people or 13.7% are between 30 and 39, 69 people or 19.7% are between 40 and 49, and 49 people or 14.0% are between 50 and 59. The senior population distribution is 47 people or 13.4% of the population are between 60 and 69 years old, 27 people or 7.7% are between 70 and 79, there are 25 people or 7.1% who are over 80.

As of 2000 the average number of residents per living room was 0.58 which is about equal to the cantonal average of 0.6 per room. In this case, a room is defined as space of a housing unit of at least 4 m^{2} (43 sq ft) as normal bedrooms, dining rooms, living rooms, kitchens and habitable cellars and attics. About 69% of the total households were owner occupied, or in other words did not pay rent (though they may have a mortgage or a rent-to-own agreement).

As of 2000, there were 144 private households in the municipality, and an average of 2.3 persons per household. In 2000 there were 211 single family homes (or 88.7% of the total) out of a total of 238 inhabited buildings. There were 26 two family buildings (10.9%) and 1 multi-family buildings (0.4%). There were also buildings in the municipality that were multipurpose buildings (used for both housing and commercial or another purpose).

The vacancy rate for the municipality, in 2008, was 0%. In 2000 there were 264 apartments in the municipality. The most common apartment size was the 3 room apartment of which there were 76. There were 23 single room apartments and 51 apartments with five or more rooms. Of these apartments, a total of 142 apartments (53.8% of the total) were permanently occupied, while 122 apartments (46.2%) were seasonally occupied. As of 2007, the construction rate of new housing units was 0 new units per 1000 residents.

The historical population is given in the following chart:

== Politics ==
In the 2007 federal election the most popular party was the CVP which received 36.13% of the vote. The next three most popular parties were the FDP (33.01%), the SP (16.1%) and the SVP (7.99%). In the federal election, a total of 218 votes were cast, and the voter turnout was 73.6%.

In the 2007 Gran Consiglio election, there were a total of 296 registered voters in Medeglia, of which 243 or 82.1% voted. 1 blank ballots and 1 null ballots were cast, leaving 241 valid ballots in the election. The most popular party was the PLRT which received 74 or 30.7% of the vote. The next three most popular parties were; the PLRT (with 74 or 30.7%), the PS (with 39 or 16.2%) and the SSI (with 25 or 10.4%).

In the 2007 Consiglio di Stato election, there were blank ballots and 1 null ballots, which left 242 valid ballots in the election. The most popular party was the PPD which received 81 or 33.5% of the vote. The next three most popular parties were; the PLRT (with 73 or 30.2%), the PS (with 44 or 18.2%) and the SSI (with 23 or 9.5%).

== Economy ==
As of 2007, Medeglia had an unemployment rate of 2.8%. As of 2005, there were people employed in the primary economic sector and about businesses involved in this sector. 4 people are employed in the secondary sector and there are 3 businesses in this sector. 11 people are employed in the tertiary sector, with 4 businesses in this sector. There were 150 residents of the municipality who were employed in some capacity, of which females made up 34.7% of the workforce. In 2000, there were 4 workers who commuted into the municipality and 116 workers who commuted away. The municipality is a net exporter of workers, with about 29.0 workers leaving the municipality for every one entering. Of the working population, 7.3% used public transportation to get to work, and 79.3% used a private car. As of 2009, there were 0 hotels in Medeglia.

== Religion ==
From the 2000 census, 289 or 87.6% were Roman Catholic, while 10 or 3.0% belonged to the Swiss Reformed Church. There are 22 individuals (or about 6.67% of the population) who belong to another church (not listed on the census), and 9 individuals (or about 2.73% of the population) did not answer the question.

== Education ==
The entire Swiss population is generally well educated. In Medeglia about 71.7% of the population (between age 25–64) have completed either non-mandatory upper secondary education or additional higher education (either University or a Fachhochschule).

In Medeglia there are a total of 44 students (as of 2009). The Ticino education system provides up to three years of non-mandatory kindergarten and in Medeglia there are 12 children in kindergarten. The primary school program lasts for five years and includes both a standard school and a special school. In the municipality, 11 students attend the standard primary schools and students attend the special school. In the lower secondary school system, students either attend a two-year middle school followed by a two-year pre-apprenticeship or they attend a four-year program to prepare for higher education. There are 9 students in the two-year middle school and in their pre-apprenticeship, while 4 students are in the four-year advanced program.

The upper secondary school includes several options, but at the end of the upper secondary program, a student will be prepared to enter a trade or to continue on to a university or college. In Ticino, vocational students may either attend school while working on their internship or apprenticeship (which takes three or four years) or may attend school followed by an internship or apprenticeship (which takes one year as a full-time student or one and a half to two years as a part-time student). There are 3 vocational students who are attending school full-time and 4 who attend part-time.

The professional program lasts three years and prepares a student for a job in engineering, nursing, computer science, business, tourism and similar fields. There are 1 students in the professional program.

As of 2000, there were 2 students in Medeglia who came from another municipality, while 35 residents attended schools outside the municipality.
