= S. Giorgio Castle =

Castle in Ticino, Switzerland

Coordinates: 45.986972°N 8.888557°E

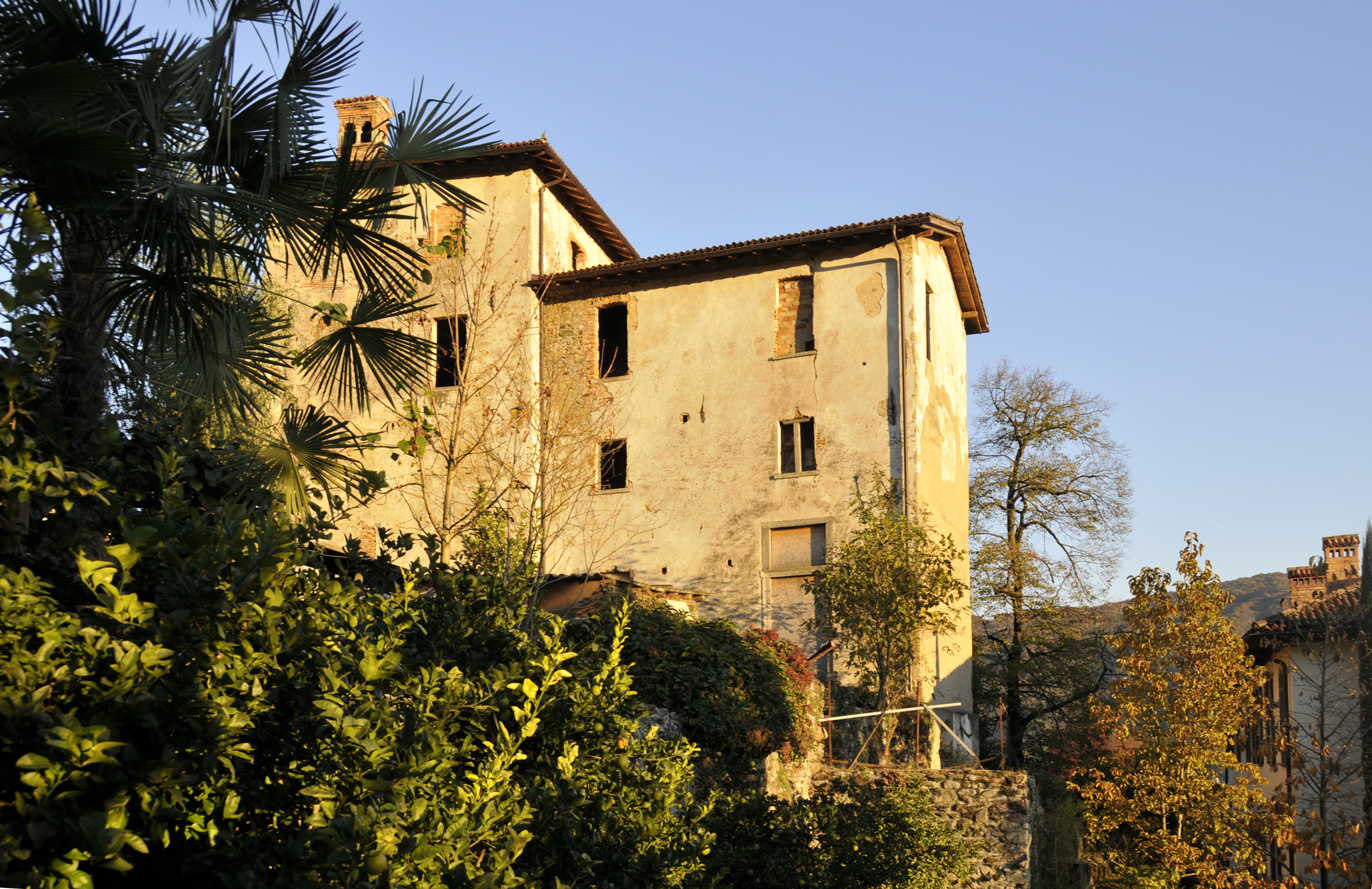
S. Giorgio Castle

S. Giorgio Castle is a castle in the municipality of Magliaso in the Swiss canton of Ticino. It is a Swiss heritage site of national significance.

== History ==
The medieval castle of San Giorgio is mentioned for the first time in 1033. It was the home for nearly two decades (1098-1117) for the schismatic bishop of Como, Landolfo Carcano, who was appointed by Emperor Henry IV against Pope Gregory VII's bishop. The castle was besieged and conquered in 1117 by Como and the fate of Landolfo, is uncertain (possibly deported or murdered). This caused the ten-year war between Como and Milan. In 1667 Giovanni Maria Castoreo di Lugano sold the castle with its surrounding land to the Beroldingen family. Carlo Corrado Beroldingen added, in 1687, to the west, the residential tower next to the medieval tower. It was partially destroyed in 1907.

The square tower on the south wall still has fragments of a Romanesque spiral decoration. In the north-west wall there are remains of a semi-circular brick wall. The two lines of the Beroldingen family passed from father to son the office of Landscriba (Chancellor) of the bailiwick of Lugano and Mendrisio. Beroldingen di Magliaso family, also received, in fief, the territory of the Vicinanza with all the rights to hunting, fishing, and low justice. After Carlo Corrado, who at the height of his fortune also owned two buildings in Lugano (Villa Favorita and Villa Ciani), the family fortune rapidly declined and they fell further and further into debt. In 1788 the Baron Giuseppe Antonio Beroldingen (fourth lord of Magliaso) gave the castle to Jost Müller of Altdorf, who kept it until 1798.
