= Rivera (surname) =

Rivera is a surname of Spanish, Portuguese, Galician, and Italian origin which was the old spelling of ribera, the Spanish word for "riverbank".

== People with the surname ==
- Adrienne Rivera, American para-alpine skier
- Albert Rivera (born 1979), Spanish former politician
- Alberto Rivera (activist) (1935–1997), anti-Catholic religious activist
- Alberto Rivera Pizarro (born 1978), Spanish retired footballer
- Alexis Marie Rivera (1977–2012), American transgender advocate
- Alicia Herrera Rivera (1928–2013), Chilean feminist lawyer
- Amaad Rivera-Wagner (born 1981), American politician
- Amos Rivera (born 1977), Filipino politician
- Andy Rivera (born 1994), Colombian singer-songwriter
- Angélica Rivera (born 1969), Mexican actress and model
- Aníbal Meléndez Rivera (1948–2021), Puerto Rican politician
- Antonio Rivera (1963–2005), Puerto Rican boxer
- Ariel Rivera (born 1966), Filipino actor and singer
- Arturo Rivera (1945–2020), Mexican artist
- Belarmino Rivera (born 1956), Honduran retired football player
- Bong Rivera (born 1968), Filipino politician and businessman
- Brent Rivera (born 1998), American social media personality and actor
- Carlos Rivera (born 1986), Mexican singer
- Carlos Rivera (disambiguation), multiple people
- Cayetano Rivera Ordóñez (born 1977), Spanish bullfighter
- Chiquis Rivera (born 1985), American singer and television personality
- Chita Rivera (1933–2024), American actress and dancer
- Coryn Rivera (born 1992), American racing cyclist
- Danny Rivera (born 1945), Puerto Rican singer-songwriter
- David Rivera (born 1965), American politician
- David Rodríguez Rivera, Salvadoran priest and politician
- Diego Rivera (1886–1957), Mexican muralist
- Doriana Rivera (born 1977), Peruvian retired badminton player
- Eduardo Rivera (disambiguation), multiple people
- Eliu Rivera (1943–2017), Puerto Rican politician
- Emilio Rivera (born 1961), American actor and stand-up comedian
- Emmanuel Rivera (born 1996), Puerto Rican professional baseball player
- Erica Rivera (born 1988), American rapper and actress
- Fernando Rivera y Moncada (1725–1781), Spanish colonial soldier and official in New Spain
- Filiberto Rivera (born 1982), Puerto Rican professional basketball player
- Frances Rivera (born 1970), Filipino-American journalist and news anchor
- Francisco Rivera Ordóñez (born 1974), Spanish bullfighter
- Francisco Rivera Pérez (1948–1984), Spanish bullfighter
- Fructuoso Rivera (1784–1854), 1st Constitutional President of Uruguay
- Gabriel Rivera (1961–2018), American professional footballer
- Gelo Rivera (born 2001), Filipino actor, singer and member of Filipino boy group BGYO
- Geraldo Rivera (born 1943), American journalist, attorney, author, political commentator
- Gianni Rivera (born 1943), Italian politician and former footballer
- Graciela Rivera (1921–2011), Puerto Rican singer
- Guillermo Rivera (born 1969), Salvadoran retired professional footballer
- Guillermo Rivera Aránguiz (born 1989), Chilean former professional tennis player
- Ingrid Marie Rivera (born 1983), Puerto Rican actress, model, 2nd runner-up of Miss World 2005
- Ismael Rivera (1931–1987), Puerto Rican composer and singer
- Ismael Rivera (archer) (born 1951), Puerto Rican archer
- James Rivera (born 1960), American singer
- Jamie Rivera (born 1966), Filipino singer
- Jenni Rivera (1969–2012), Mexican singer-songwriter
- Jerry Rivera (born 1973), Puerto Rican singer-songwriter
- Jessica Rivera
- Jessica Rivera (music executive)
- Jim Rivera (1921–2017), American professional baseball player
- Jimmie Rivera (born 1989), American professional MMA fighter
- Joel Rivera (born 1978), American politician
- John Rivera (better known as Rocky Romero, born 1982), Cuban-American professional wrestler
- Jorge Rivera (fighter) (born 1972), American retired MMA fighter
- Jorge Rivera (basketball) (born 1973), Puerto Rican former basketball player
- Jose Rivera (politician) (born 1936), American former politician
- José Rivera (playwright) (born 1955), Puerto Rican playwright and screenwriter
- José Antonio Rivera (born 1973), American professional boxer
- José Eustasio Rivera (1888–1928), Colombian lawyer and author
- José Rivera (volleyball) (born 1977), Puerto Rican volleyball player
- Jose Luis Rivera (born 1960), Puerto Rican retired professional wrestler
- Jovette Rivera (born 1982), American musician
- Juan Rivera (disambiguation), multiple people
- Leonor Rivera (1867–1893), lover of the Philippine national hero Jose Rizal
- Lionel Rivera (born 1956), American politician
- Lissa Rivera (born 1984), American artist, curator, and filmmaker
- Luis Antonio Rivera (1930–2023), Puerto Rican actor, television personality, comedian
- Luis Rivera (disambiguation), multiple people
- Lupillo Rivera (born 1972), Mexican-American singer-songwriter
- Mailon Rivera (born 1969), American actor
- Marco Rivera (born 1972), American former professional footballer
- María Antonia Rivera (born 1966), 3rd Vice President of Honduras
- Marian Rivera (born 1984), Filipino actress, television host, model
- Mariano Rivera (born 1969), Panamanian-American former professional baseball player
- Marika Rivera (1919–2010), French actress
- Mark Rivera (born 1953), American musician
- Maura Rivera (born 1984), Chilean dancer and television performer
- Maxwell (musician) (born 1973), American singer-songwriter and record producer
- Mayra Rivera (born 1968), Puerto Rican religious scholar
- Mike Rivera (baseball) (born 1976), Puerto Rican former professional baseball player
- Mike Rivera (American football) (born 1986), American former professional footballer
- Miriam Rivera (1981–2019), Mexican model and actress
- Mon Rivera, two distinct Puerto Rican musicians
- Mychal Rivera (born 1990), American former professional footballer
- Naomi Rivera (born 1963), American former politician
- Naya Rivera (1987–2020), American actress, singer, model
- Nick Rivera Caminero (stage name Nicky Jam, born 1981), American singer
- Nikki Rivera, American politician
- Norberto Rivera Carrera (born 1942), Mexican cardinal
- Oscar López Rivera (born 1943), Puerto Rican activist and militant
- Pedro Ignacio Rivera (1759–1833), Bolivian statesman and lawyer
- Peter M. Rivera (born 1946), American politician
- Prisilla Rivera (born 1984), Dominican volleyball player
- Reinaldo Rivera (born 1963), Spanish-born American serial killer
- René Rivera (born 1983), Puerto Rican former professional baseball player
- Robbie Rivera (born 1973), Puerto Rican house music producer and DJ
- Ron Rivera (born 1962), American professional football coach and former player
- Ron Rivera (public health) (1948–2008), Puerto Rican-American activist and relief worker
- Rubén Rivera (born 1973), Panamanian former professional baseball player
- Ruth Rivera Marín (1927–1969), Mexican architect
- Salvador Guerra Rivera (born 2002), Spanish chess player
- Sandy Rivera (born 1971), American record producer, house music DJ, label owner
- Saúl Rivera (born 1977), Puerto Rican former professional baseball player
- Scarlet Rivera (born 1950), American violinist
- Sophie Rivera (1938–2021), Puerto Rican-American artist and photographer
- Susana Rivera-Mills, Salvadoran sociolinguist and academic administrator
- Sylvia Rivera (1951–2002), American transgender activist
- Tammy Rivera (born 1986), American television personality, singer, fashion designer, businesswoman
- Temario Rivera (1946/1947–2024), Filipino educator and political scientist
- Teresa Rivera (born 1966), Mexican former swimmer
- Tomás Rivera (1935–1984), Mexican American author, poet, educator
- Tomás Rivera Morales (1927–2001), Puerto Rican musician
- Victor Rivera (bishop) (1916–2005), Puerto Rican Episcopalian bishop
- Víctor Rivera (judoka) (born 1965), Puerto Rican judoka
- Victor Rivera (wrestler) (born 1944), Puerto Rican retired professional wrestler
- Víctor Rivera (football manager) (born 1968), Peruvian football manager
- Víctor Rivera (volleyball) (born 1976), Puerto Rican volleyball player
- Víctor Hugo Rivera (born 1967), Peruvian football referee
- Zuleyka Rivera (born 1987), Puerto Rican actress, model, Miss Universe 2006
- Brenda Lizeth Rivera Galvan (born 1996) Mexican, model, singer, chica Carolina 2014 5th place, songwriter

=== Variants of the surname ===
Variants of the surname include "de Rivera" and "D'Rivera".

- Alice de Rivera (born 1955 or 1956), American physician and women's rights activist
- Belle de Rivera (1848-1943), American clubwoman
- José Antonio Primo de Rivera, Spanish politician
- Miguel Primo de Rivera, Spanish dictator
- Paquito D'Rivera, Cuban musician

=== Fictional characters ===
- Alicia Rivera, The Clique
- Eugene Rivera, Oz
- Eduardo Rivera, Extreme Ghostbusters
- Emery Rivera, Daybreak
- Manny Rivera, El Tigre: The Adventures of Manny Rivera
- Rivera clan: Hector, Imelda, Miguel, Socorro (Coco), et al.; Coco (2017 film)

== People with the given name ==
Rivera is uncommon as a given name or middle name.

- José Rivera Indarte (1814–1845), Argentine poet and journalist

== See also ==
- Rivera (disambiguation)
- Ribera (disambiguation)
- Riviera (disambiguation)
- Riva (surname)
- Rio (disambiguation)
- Ríos (disambiguation)
