= TPO =

TPO may refer to:

== Arts ==
- Taipei Philharmonic Orchestra
- Thailand Philharmonic Orchestra
- Tin Pot Operation, an indie-punk band from Belfast, Northern Ireland
- Tokyo Philharmonic Orchestra
- Turku Philharmonic Orchestra, Finland

== Biology and medicine ==
- the temporo-parieto-occipital junction of the brain
- Thyroid peroxidase (or thyroperoxidase), an enzyme in the thyroid
- Thrombopoietin, a hormone stimulating platelet growth

== Government ==
- Transportation Planning Organization, United States

== Law ==
- Temporary protective order, a court order banning someone from going near a third party that they have allegedly harassed, in Ireland or the United States
- a tree preservation order in the United Kingdom

== Science and technology ==
- Thermoplastic olefin, a plastic polymer/filler blend
- Transmitter power output in radio transmission
- Trimethylbenzoyl diphenylphosphine oxide, a photoinitiator used in UV-curable systems, such as artificial nail products, to enable rapid hardening under UV light

== Other ==
- The People's Operator, a mobile virtual network operator in the United Kingdom
- Third-party ownership in association football
- A transit patrol officer of Victoria Transit Patrol, Australia
- Travelling Post Offices, mail trains in Great Britain and Ireland
- Travelling Post Office, Queensland, mail trains in Australia
- Treatment plant operator, an operator of water and waste water treatment plants
- Triple peel on opponent manoeuvre in croquet
