= Lodrino, Ticino =

Lodrino
- Former municipality
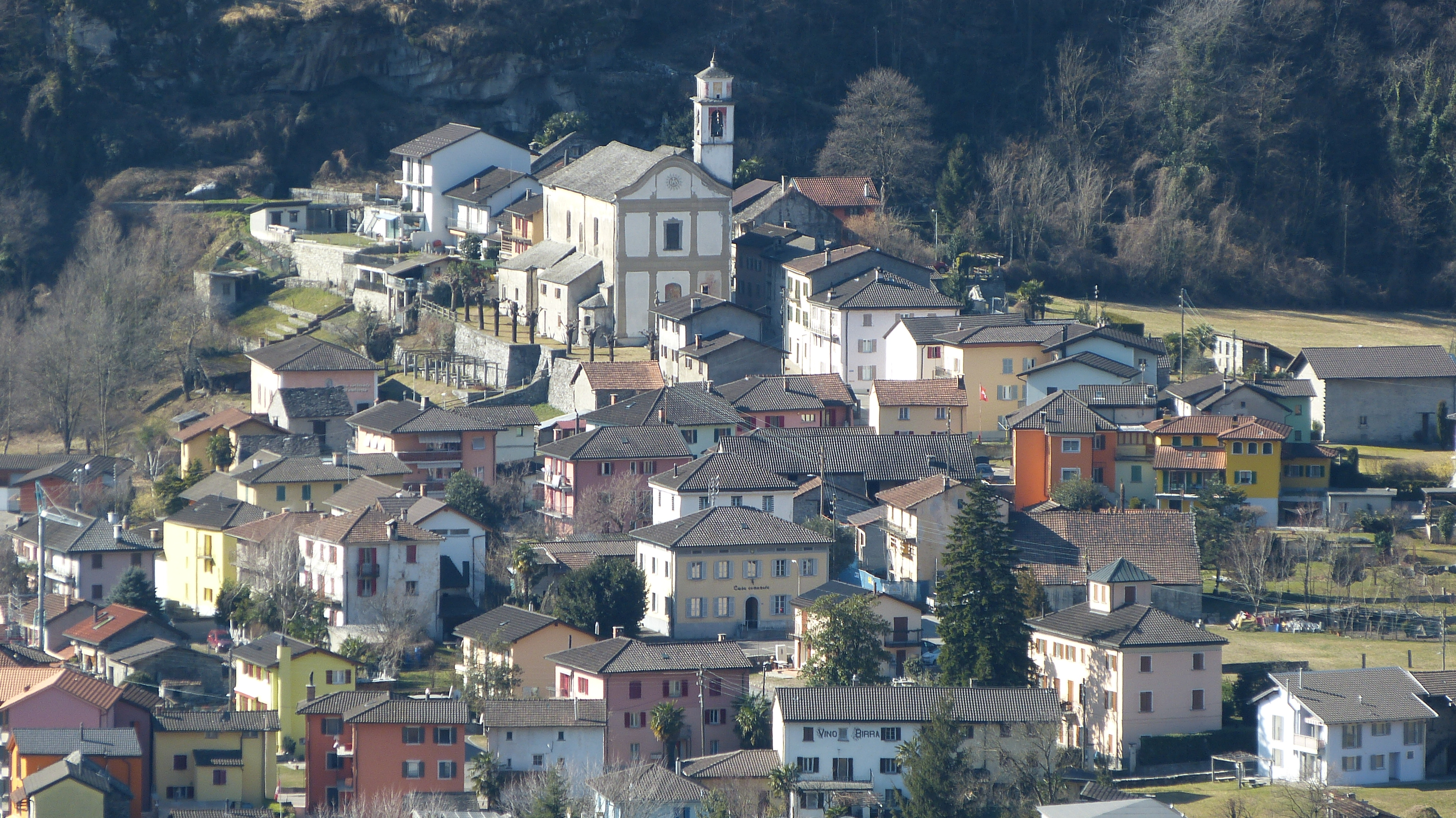
- Lodrino

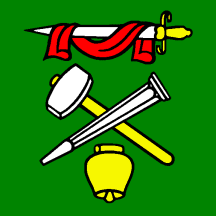
- Flag Coat of arms
- Location of Lodrino
- Location within Switzerland Location within Canton of Ticino
- Coordinates: 46°18′N 8°59′E
- Country: Switzerland
- Canton: Ticino
- District: Riviera

Area
  - Total: 31.5 km^{2} (12.2 sq mi)
- Elevation: 269 m (883 ft)

Population (December 2004)
  - Total: 1,556
  - Density: 49.4/km^{2} (128/sq mi)
- Demonym: Lodrinese
- Time zone: UTC+01:00 (CET)
  - Summer (DST): UTC+02:00 (CEST)
- Postal code: 6527
- SFOS number: 5285
- ISO 3166 code: CH-TI
- Surrounded by: Biasca, Cresciano, Iragna, Lavertezzo, Moleno, Osogna, Preonzo
- Twin towns: Lodrino, Lombardy
- Website: SFSO statistics

Lodrino is a former municipality in the district of Riviera in the canton of Ticino in Switzerland.

On 2 April 2017 the former municipalities of Cresciano, Iragna and Osogna merged into the new municipality of Riviera.

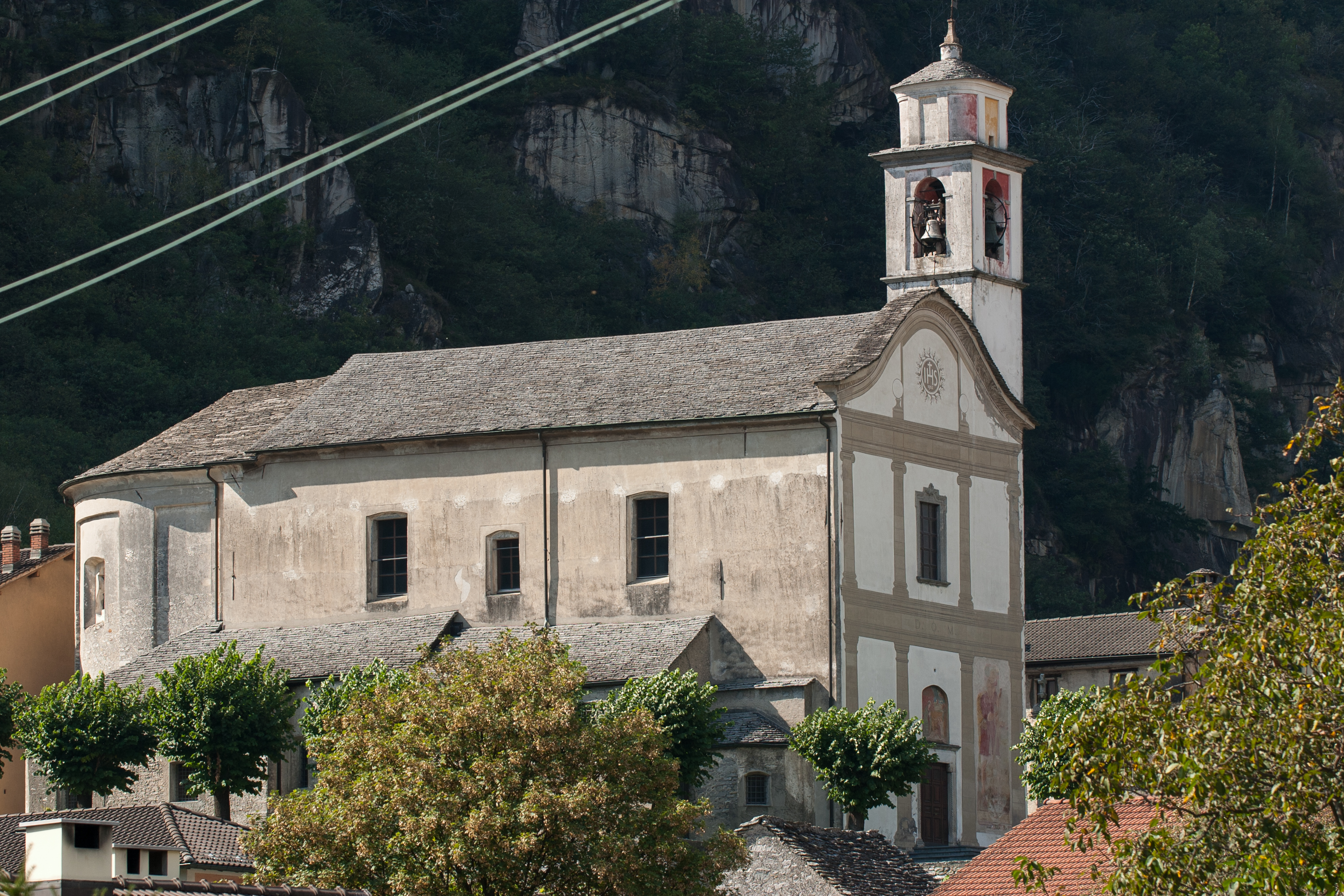
Chiesa parrocchiale di Sant' Ambrogio

== History ==
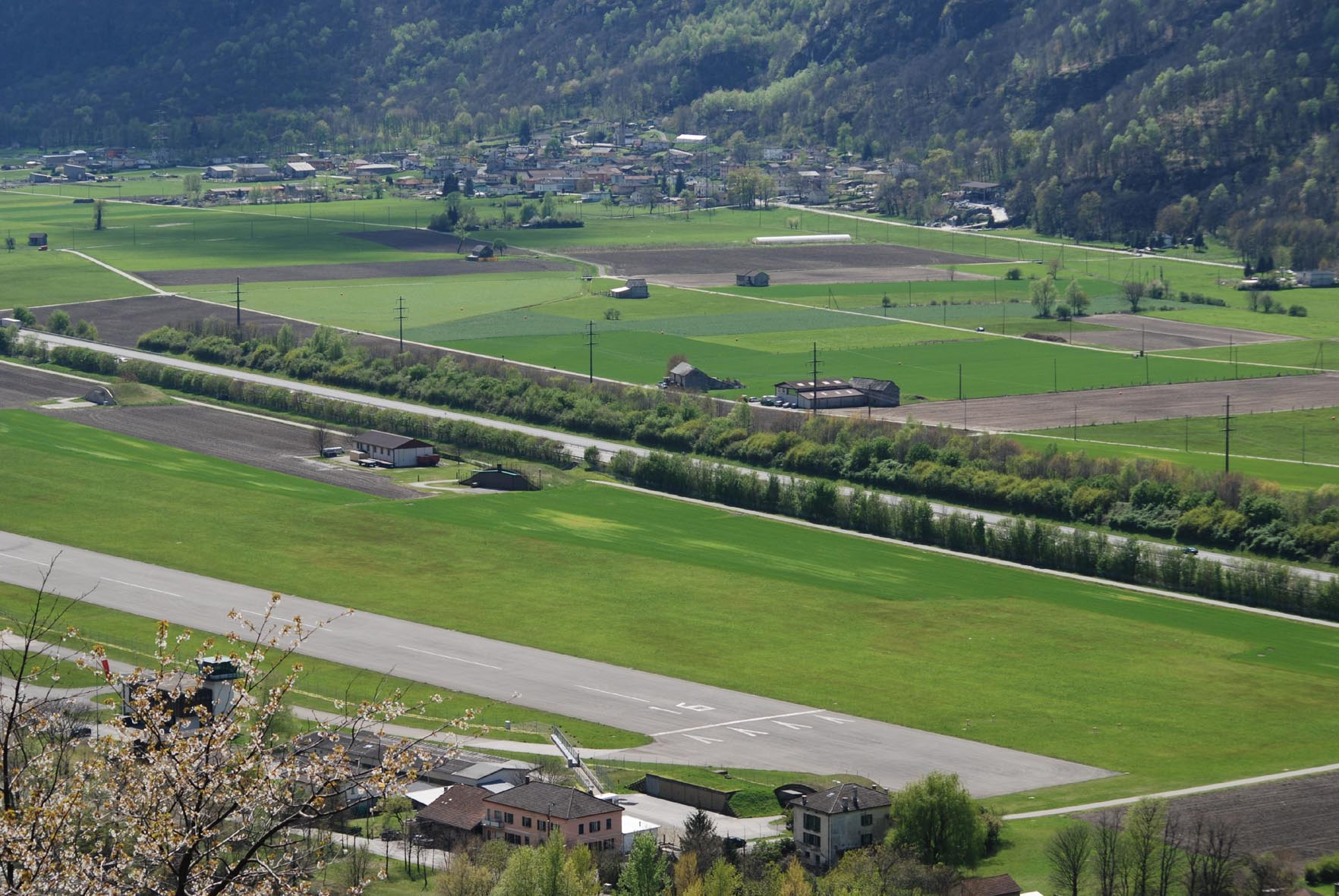
Lodrino airfield

Lodrino is first mentioned in 857 as Ludrini. In 1193 it was mentioned as Ludrino.

Remains of fortifications suggest that in the 12th and 13th century a noble family, perhaps from Lombardy, lived in Lodrino. During the Middle Ages, Lodrino also included the hamlet of Prosito (called Proxedrium in the 13th century). Until the mid-15th century, Prosito probably had the same status as Lodrino and Iragna. The hamlets on the mountainside formed the community of Monte Parli, which was first mentioned in 1207.

The parish church of SS Gervasio e Protasio in Prosito was built in the 13th century and was, perhaps, a private church. The center Monte Parli was the Chapel of San Martino di Monte Paglio, which was built in 1215. It was originally the parish church of the hamlets and was known as SS Placido e Sigisberto. The main church in Lodrino was the church of St. Ambrogio which was first mentioned in 1375. It was built on the foundation of a romanesque church from the 11th-12th centuries. The churches were supported in the Middle Ages by the Vicar of Biasca. When the Duke of Milan ceded the Levantine to Uri in 1441, he reorganized his holdings in the Riviera. The villages Lodrino, Prosito and Iragna were incorporated in a ducal vicariate, which was allowed to elect their own village officials. In the administration as well as civil and criminal law the villages were given considerable autonomy. They were given village statutes of 1450 and again in 1492. In 1496 Lodrino, Prosito and Iragna swore their loyalty to the Swiss Confederation.

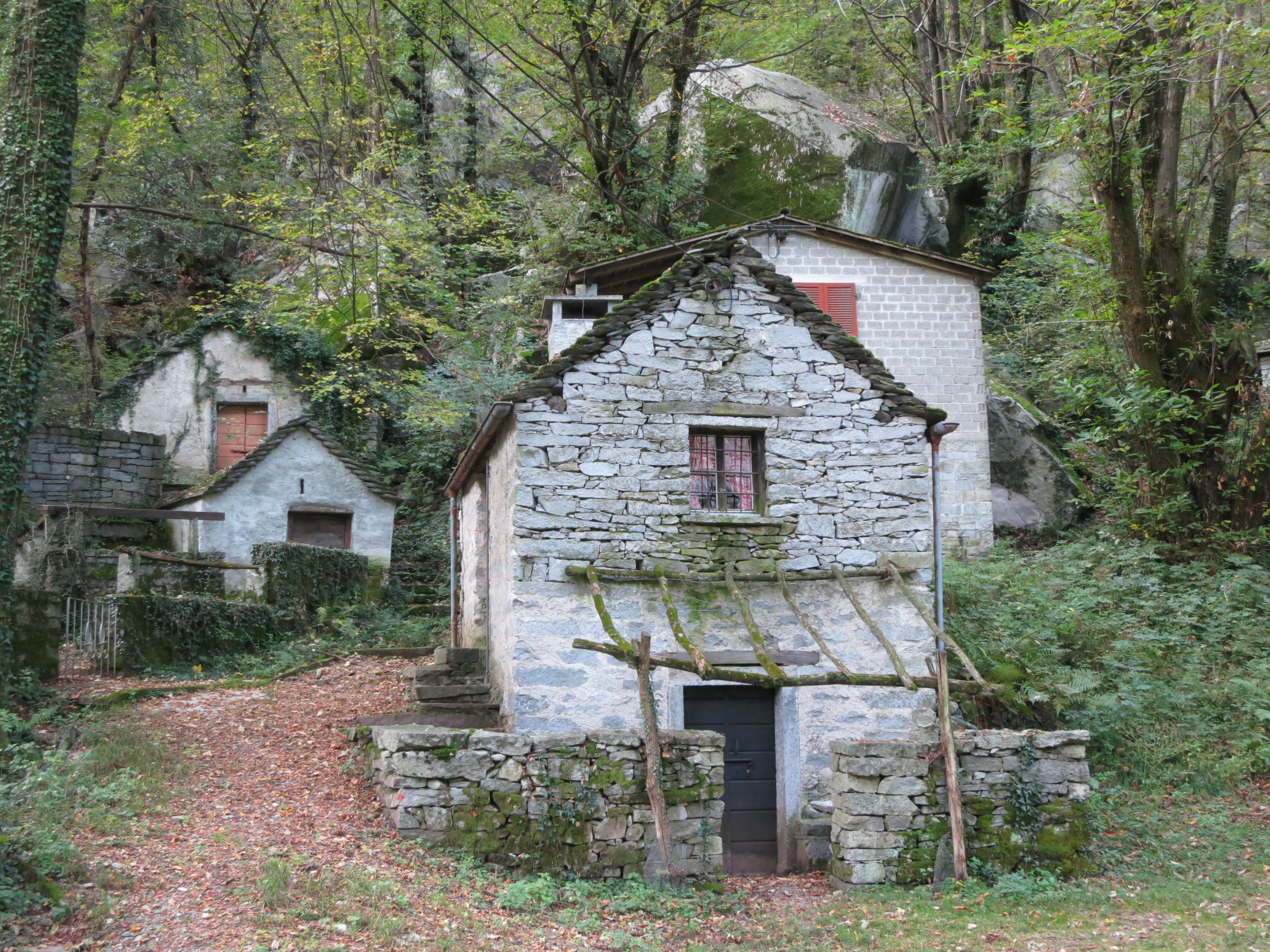
Lodrino Grotti

In past centuries, the population lived on agriculture and livestock. Between 1782 and 1869 there was a glass factory and a little temporary textile industry in the village. Following the closure of the glass factory, many former workers were compelled to find work as glaziers abroad, mostly in France and especially Paris. However, the rate of emigration from Riviera in the 19th century was among the lowest in Ticino; just 6% of the population, as opposed to a cantonal average of 15%, emigrated. The construction of the Gotthard railway required a number of granite quarries to supply stone for the project. Some of the quarries are still in operation in spite of a strong and steady decline of the workforce. In 1939, the so-called Lona-line (Lodrino-Osogna) was built, a 10 km (6.2 mi) long fortified line with 23 anti-tank forts. Since 1943, a small military airfield, the Lodrino Air Base, has been in operation. It is now also used as a civilian helicopter landing site. In the last decades of the 20th century there was major construction activity in the municipality. Many new homes as well as schools (primary and advanced) and sports facilities were built.

== Geography ==
Lodrino has an area, as of 1997, of 31.5 square kilometers (12.2 sq mi). Of this area, 2.48 km^{2} (0.96 sq mi) or 7.9% is used for agricultural purposes, while 21.5 km^{2} (8.3 sq mi) or 68.3% is forested. Of the rest of the land, 1.13 km^{2} (0.44 sq mi) or 3.6% is settled (buildings or roads), 0.59 km^{2} (0.23 sq mi) or 1.9% is either rivers or lakes and 5.43 km^{2} (2.10 sq mi) or 17.2% is unproductive land.

Of the built up area, housing and buildings made up 1.5% and transportation infrastructure made up 1.3%. Out of the forested land, 54.4% of the total land area is heavily forested, while 11.9% is covered in small trees and shrubbery and 1.9% is covered with orchards or small clusters of trees. Of the agricultural land, 6.2% is used for growing crops and 1.5% is used for alpine pastures. All the water in the municipality is flowing water. Of the unproductive areas, 8.6% is unproductive vegetation and 8.6% is too rocky for vegetation.

The municipality is located in the Riviera district on the right bank of the Ticino river.

== Coat of arms ==
The blazon of the municipal coat of arms is Vert a chisel argent and a hammer or headed argent in saltire in chief a cloak gules over a sword also argent hendeled or and in base a bell also or. The chisel and hammer represent the quarries that provided employment to many residents of the town. The cloak on the sword is an attribute of Saint Martin, the patron saint of the village.

== Demographics ==
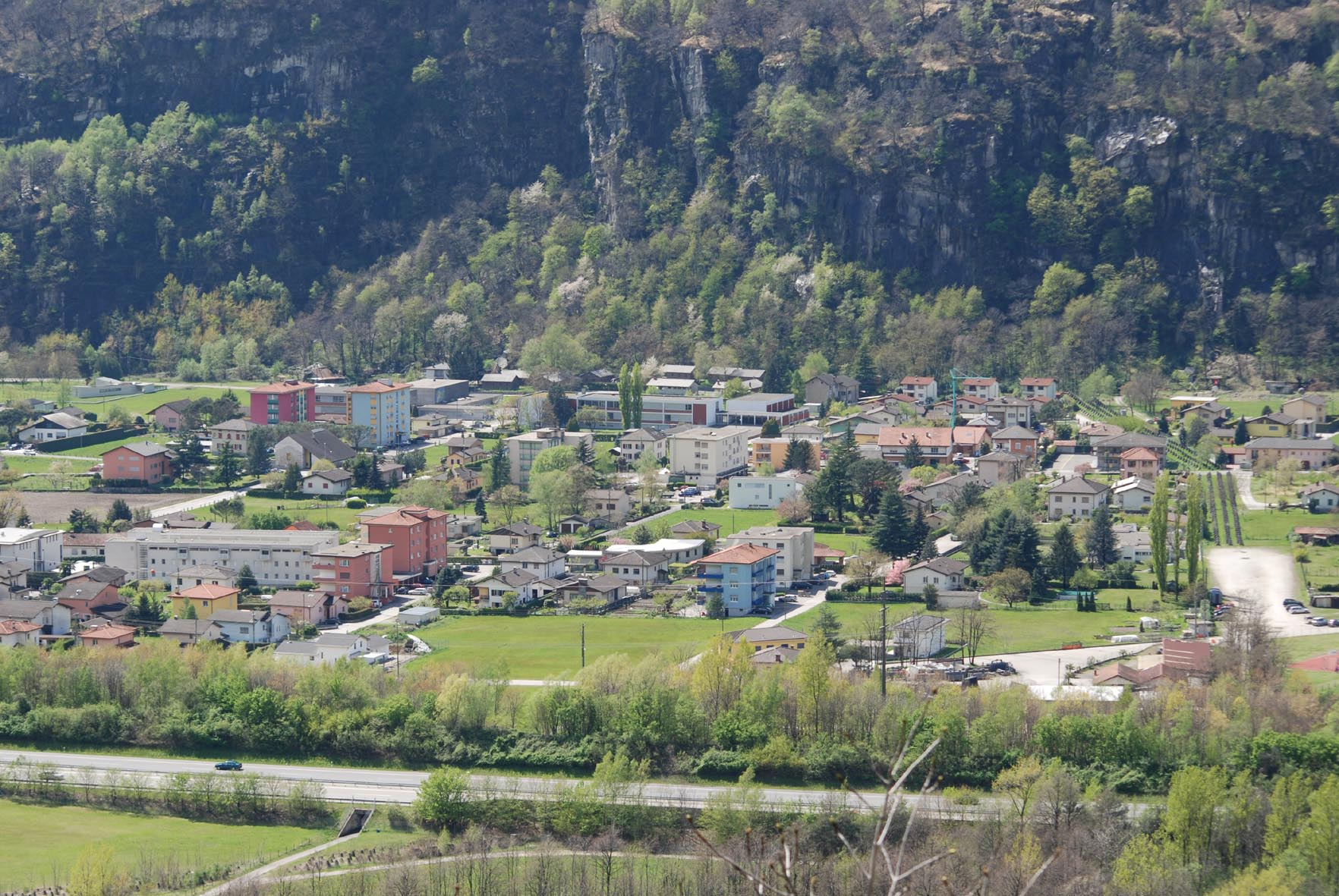
Sports center and modern village of Lodrino

Lodrino has a population (as of December 2020) of 1,770. As of 2008, 27.1% of the population are resident foreign nationals. Over the last 10 years (1997–2007) the population has changed at a rate of 12.9%. Most of the population (as of 2000) speaks Italian language (1,292 or 88.4%), with Portuguese being second most common (70 or 4.8%) and Serbo-Croatian being third (36 or 2.5%). There are 16 people who speak French and 3 people who speak Romansh.

As of 2008, the gender distribution of the population was 51.4% male and 48.6% female. The population was made up of 573 Swiss men (34.9% of the population), and 270 (16.5%) non-Swiss men. There were 611 Swiss women (37.2%), and 187 (11.4%) non-Swiss women. Of the population in the municipality 603 or about 41.3% were born in Lodrino and lived there in 2000. There were 305 or 20.9% who were born in the same canton, while 85 or 5.8% were born somewhere else in Switzerland, and 429 or 29.4% were born outside of Switzerland.

In 2008 there were 12 live births to Swiss citizens and 5 births to non-Swiss citizens, and in same time span there were 5 deaths of Swiss citizens and 2 non-Swiss citizen deaths. Ignoring immigration and emigration, the population of Swiss citizens increased by 7 while the foreign population increased by 3. There were 14 non-Swiss men and 7 non-Swiss women who immigrated from another country to Switzerland. The total Swiss population change in 2008 (from all sources, including moves across municipal borders) was an increase of 3 and the non-Swiss population stayed the same. This represents a population growth rate of 0.2%.

The age distribution, as of 2009, in Lodrino is; 172 children or 10.5% of the population are between 0 and 9 years old and 186 teenagers or 11.3% are between 10 and 19. Of the adult population, 159 people or 9.7% of the population are between 20 and 29 years old. 246 people or 15.0% are between 30 and 39, 283 people or 17.2% are between 40 and 49, and 194 people or 11.8% are between 50 and 59. The senior population distribution is 200 people or 12.2% of the population are between 60 and 69 years old, 144 people or 8.8% are between 70 and 79, there are 57 people or 3.5% who are over 80.

As of 2000, there were 544 people who were single and never married in the municipality. There were 802 married individuals, 66 widows or widowers and 49 individuals who are divorced.

As of 2000, there were 549 private households in the municipality, and an average of 2.6 persons per household. There were 117 households that consist of only one person and 40 households with five or more people. Out of a total of 551 households that answered this question, 21.2% were households made up of just one person and 10 were adults who lived with their parents. Of the rest of the households, there are 138 married couples without children, 245 married couples with children There were 27 single parents with a child or children. There were 12 households that were made up unrelated people and 2 households that were made some sort of institution or another collective housing.

In 2000 there were 298 single family homes (or 73.0% of the total) out of a total of 408 inhabited buildings. There were 98 multi-family buildings (24.0%), along with 7 multi-purpose buildings that were mostly used for housing (1.7%) and 5 other use buildings (commercial or industrial) that also had some housing (1.2%). Of the single family homes 4 were built before 1919, while 40 were built between 1990 and 2000. The greatest number of single family homes (127) were built between 1919 and 1945.

In 2000 there were 671 apartments in the municipality. The most common apartment size was 4 rooms of which there were 211. There were 48 single room apartments and 164 apartments with five or more rooms. Of these apartments, a total of 542 apartments (80.8% of the total) were permanently occupied, while 112 apartments (16.7%) were seasonally occupied and 17 apartments (2.5%) were empty. As of 2007, the construction rate of new housing units was 3.7 new units per 1000 residents. The vacancy rate for the municipality, in 2008, was 0.28%.

The historical population is given in the following chart:

== Politics ==
In the 2007 federal election the most popular party was the CVP which received 42.9% of the vote. The next three most popular parties were the FDP (21.39%), the SP (17.2%) and the Ticino League (11.05%). In the federal election, a total of 507 votes were cast, and the voter turnout was 54.6%.

In the 2007 Gran Consiglio election, there were a total of 941 registered voters in Lodrino, of which 696 or 74.0% voted. 5 blank ballots and 1 null ballot were cast, leaving 690 valid ballots in the election. The most popular party was the PPD+GenGiova which received 231 or 33.5% of the vote. The next three most popular parties were; the SSI (with 123 or 17.8%), the PLRT (with 108 or 15.7%) and the PS (with 104 or 15.1%).

In the 2007 Consiglio di Stato election, 5 blank ballots and 1 null ballot were cast, leaving 690 valid ballots in the election. The most popular party was the PPD which received 237 or 34.3% of the vote. The next three most popular parties were; the PS (with 123 or 17.8%), the LEGA (with 111 or 16.1%) and the PLRT (with 101 or 14.6%).

== Economy ==
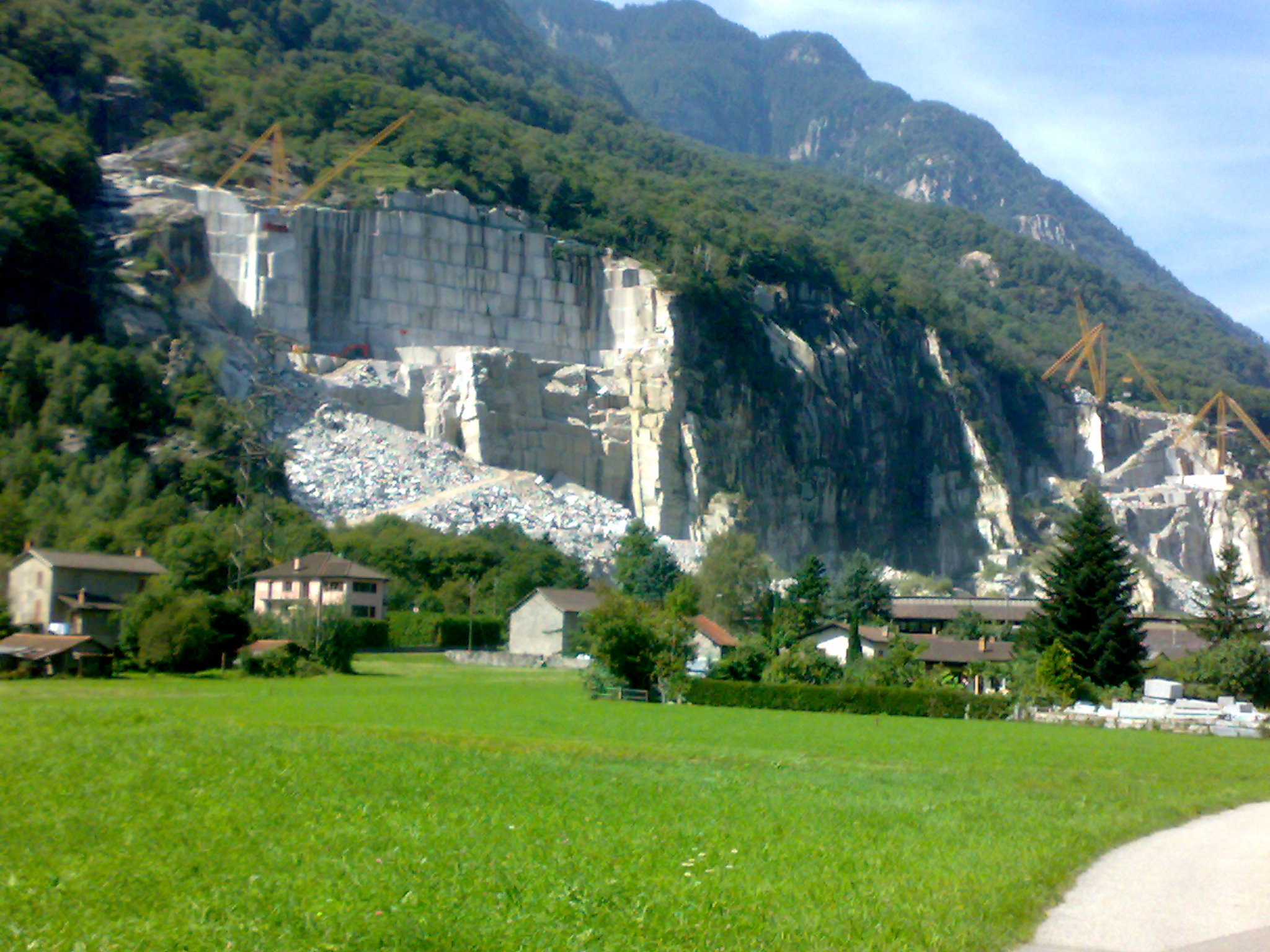
A quarry at Lodrino

As of 2007, Lodrino had an unemployment rate of 3.89%. As of 2005, there were 28 people employed in the primary economic sector and about 10 businesses involved in this sector. 291 people were employed in the secondary sector and there were 30 businesses in this sector. 344 people were employed in the tertiary sector, with 33 businesses in this sector. There were 662 residents of the municipality who were employed in some capacity, of which females made up 34.1% of the workforce.

In 2008 the total number of full-time equivalent jobs was 604. The number of jobs in the primary sector was 9, all of which were in agriculture. The number of jobs in the secondary sector was 236, of which 127 or (53.8%) were in manufacturing, 53 or (22.5%) were in mining and 57 (24.2%) were in construction. The number of jobs in the tertiary sector was 359. In the tertiary sector; 13 or 3.6% were in wholesale or retail sales or the repair of motor vehicles, 39 or 10.9% were in the movement and storage of goods, 18 or 5.0% were in a hotel or restaurant, 2 or 0.6% were the insurance or financial industry, 218 or 60.7% were technical professionals or scientists, 35 or 9.7% were in education and 8 or 2.2% were in health care.

In 2000, there were 325 workers who commuted into the municipality and 412 workers who commuted away. The municipality is a net exporter of workers, with about 1.3 workers leaving the municipality for every one entering. Of the working population, 6.6% used public transportation to get to work, and 65.3% used a private car.

== Religion ==
From the 2000 census, 1,262 or 86.4% were Roman Catholic, while 21 or 1.4% belonged to the Swiss Reformed Church. Of the rest of the population, there were 45 members of an Orthodox church (or about 3.08% of the population), and there were 4 individuals (or about 0.27% of the population) who belonged to another Christian church. There was 1 individual who was Jewish, and 16 (or about 1.10% of the population) who were Islamic. There was 1 individual who was Buddhist, 63 (or about 4.31% of the population) who belonged to no church, were agnostic or atheist, and 48 individuals (or about 3.29% of the population) did not answer the question.

== Education ==
In Lodrino about 517 or (35.4%) of the population have completed non-mandatory upper secondary education, and 86 or (5.9%) have completed additional higher education (either university or a Fachhochschule). Of the 86 who completed tertiary schooling, 65.1% were Swiss men, 23.3% were Swiss women, 8.1% were non-Swiss men.

In Lodrino there were a total of 289 students (as of 2009). The Ticino education system provides up to three years of non-mandatory kindergarten and in Lodrino there were 47 children in kindergarten. The primary school program lasts for five years and includes both a standard school and a special school. In the municipality, 94 students attended the standard primary schools and 4 students attended the special school. In the lower secondary school system, students either attend a two-year middle school followed by a two-year pre-apprenticeship or they attend a four-year program to prepare for higher education. There were 76 students in the two-year middle school and 1 in their pre-apprenticeship, while 30 students were in the four-year advanced program.

The upper secondary school includes several options, but at the end of the upper secondary program, a student will be prepared to enter a trade or to continue on to a university or college. In Ticino, vocational students may either attend school while working on their internship or apprenticeship (which takes three or four years) or may attend school followed by an internship or apprenticeship (which takes one year as a full-time student or one and a half to two years as a part-time student). There were 11 vocational students who were attending school full-time and 23 who attend part-time.

The professional program lasts three years and prepares a student for a job in engineering, nursing, computer science, business, tourism and similar fields. There were 3 students in the professional program.

As of 2000, there were 129 students in Lodrino who came from another municipality, while 36 residents attended schools outside the municipality.
