= Riviera (disambiguation) =

Riviera is an old term for the coast of Liguria, now used specifically for the French Riviera and the Italian Riviera. For coastal areas popular with tourists that may be called rivieras, see Riviera.

Riviera may also refer to:

== Places ==
- Irish Riviera, a term used to refer to various locations in the United States with high population of Irish Americans
- Riviera District, Switzerland
- Riviera, Ticino, a municipality in Switzerland
- Riviera, Gauteng, a suburb of Johannesburg, South Africa
- Riviera, Texas, an unincorporated community
- La Riviera, Sacramento County, California, a census-designated place
- Riviera Ridge, Antarctica
- 1426 Riviera, an asteroid
- Riviera (Warsaw), a residential building in Warsaw, Poland

== In business ==
- Buick Riviera, an American luxury car built from 1963 to 1999
- Disney's Riviera Resort, a European Riviera-themed Disney Vacation Club resort in Bay Lake, Florida
- Riviera, a brand of cigarettes produced by Commonwealth Brands
- Riviera, a model of guitar manufactured by Epiphone
- Riviera (hotel and casino), former resort on the Las Vegas Strip
  - Riviera Holdings, the operator of the Riviera Casino
- Riviera (nightclub), formerly outside of New York City in Fort Lee, New Jersey
- Riviera (restaurant), restaurant in Ottawa, Ontario
- Riviera Line, a local English railway line that links Exeter with Torbay
- SIAI-Marchetti FN.333 Riviera, an Italian luxury flying boat

== Arts and entertainment ==
=== Film and television ===
- Riviera (TV series), a British thriller series
- Riviera, one of several names under which the film La spiaggia (1954) was released

=== Music ===
- "Riviera" (song), a 1956 song
- Riviera (Big Head Todd and the Monsters album), 2002
- The Rivieras, a 1960s rock and roll band
- Jake Riviera, music producer
- Riviera (The Hellp album), 2025

=== Other ===
- Riviera (sculpture), a work by Anthony Caro formerly at Olympic Sculpture Park, Seattle, Washington, US
- Riviera, VIT University, the annual international sports and cultural carnival of the Vellore Institute of Technology
- Riviera: The Promised Land, a role-playing game for the WonderSwan Color, Game Boy Advance, and PlayStation Portable

== Buildings in the United States ==
- Riviera Apartments (Baltimore, Maryland), an apartment building on the National Register of Historic Places
- The Riviera (Boston, Massachusetts), an apartment building on the National Register of Historic Places
- Astro Theater, Omaha, Nebraska, originally named The Riviera, on the National Register of Historic Places
- Riviera Theatre (North Tonawanda, New York), an entertainment venue on the National Register of Historic Places
- Riviera Theatre, a concert venue in Chicago, Illinois

== Ships ==
- HMS Riviera, a seaplane tender in the First World War, a trainer and transport in the Second, as well as a fast Cross-Channel steamer
- MS Riviera, a cruise ship
- SS Reina del Mar, a cruise ship later renamed Riviera

== Other uses ==
- Riviera Country Club, Pacific Palisades, California, notable for its golf course
- Riviera Football League, an Australian rules football league (1986–2003)
- Riviera MRT/LRT station, Singapore

== See also ==
- Rivera (disambiguation)
- Rio (disambiguation)
- Ríos (disambiguation)
