= Ribero (disambiguation) =

Ribero was a racehorse and sire.

Ribero may also refer to:

== People ==
- Aurora Ribero (born 2004), Indonesian actress, model, and singer
- Diego Ribero (died 1533), Spanish name for the Portuguese cartographer and explorer Diogo Ribeiro
- Felipe Ribero y Lemoine (1797–1873), Spanish politician, governor, minister, and military leader
- Lydia Cacho Ribero (born 1963), Mexican journalist, feminist, and human rights activist
- Maximiliano Ribero (born 1997), Argentine professional footballer
- Pedro José de Zavala y Bravo de Ribero (1779–1850), also known as Pedro José de Zavala, 7th Marquess of Valleumbroso, Spanish-Peruvian nobleman and soldier
- Tito Ribero (1915–1964), born Alberto Amado Ribero, Argentine composer, singer, and musician

== Places ==
- Ribero Municipality, a municipality of Sucre, Venezuela

== See also ==
- Ribera
- Ribeiro
- Rivero
- Rio (disambiguation)
- Ríos (disambiguation)
