= Rivero =

Rivero may refer to:

- Rivero Island, in Chile
- Villa Rivero, a village in the Cochabamba Department, Bolivia
- Rivero (surname)

== See also ==
- Ribero (disambiguation)
- Rio (disambiguation)
- Ríos (disambiguation)
