= Iragna =

- Former municipality
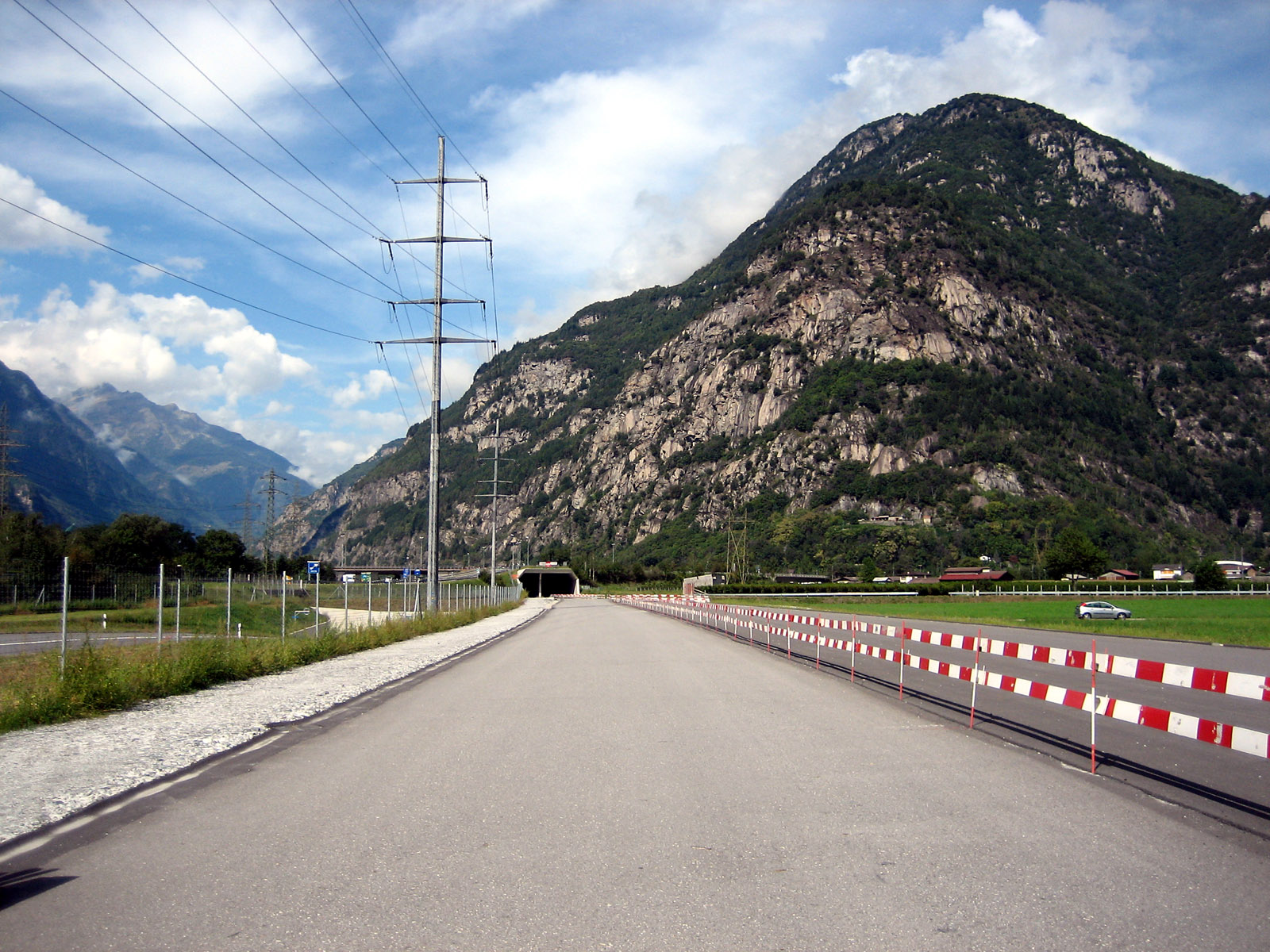
- The Iragna tunnel of the Gotthard Base

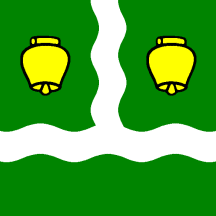
- Flag Coat of arms
- Location of Iragna
- Location within Switzerland Location within Canton of Ticino
- Coordinates: 46°20′N 8°58′E
- Country: Switzerland
- Canton: Ticino
- District: Riviera

Area
  - Total: 18.39 km^{2} (7.10 sq mi)
- Elevation: 295 m (968 ft)

Population (December 2004)
  - Total: 495
  - Density: 26.9/km^{2} (69.7/sq mi)
- Time zone: UTC+01:00 (CET)
  - Summer (DST): UTC+02:00 (CEST)
- Postal code: 6707
- SFOS number: 5284
- ISO 3166 code: CH-TI
- Surrounded by: Biasca, Lavertezzo, Lodrino, Osogna, Personico
- Website: iragna.ch

Iragna is a former municipality in the district of Riviera in the canton of Ticino in Switzerland.

On 2 April 2017 the former municipalities of Cresciano, Lodrino and Osogna merged into the new municipality of Riviera.

== History ==
Iragna is first mentioned in 1210 as Inagna.

Iragna was one of the ten village cooperatives (Vicini), which formed the municipality of Levantine. It belonged to the valley community in 1441 when the entire Levantine along with Lodrino and its hamlets were conquered by Uri. At that time Iragna became part of the Vicariate of the dukes of Milan. Under Milan, the long-established citizens of the village were allowed to select their own bailiff. In the first half of the 17th century, the population of Iragna was involved in a series of witch trials.

The church of SS Eusebio e Gaudenzio has been in use since 1210.

Since Iragna was on a road that offered an alternative route to the traditional trans-alpine route through Biasca, it possessed a travellers hospice starting in 1288. The hospice was supported and directed by the hospice in Pollegio.

Iragna's chestnut forests were used to provide wood to residents of the middle and upper Leventina. Granite mining has been a major source of income since the end of the 19th century.

== Geography ==
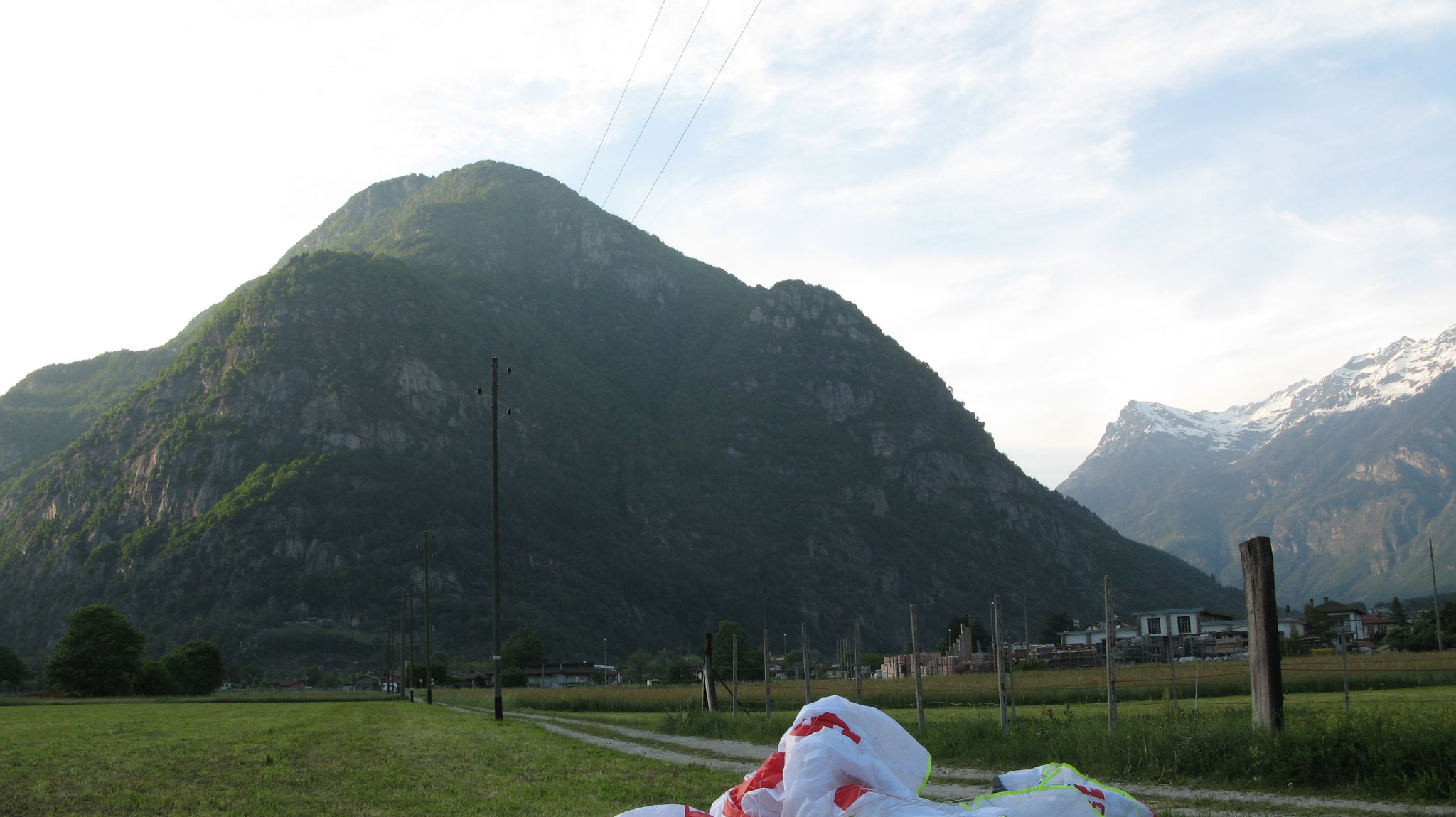
A field outside Iragna

Iragna has an area, as of 1997, of 18.39 square kilometers (7.10 sq mi). Of this area, 0.81 km^{2} (0.31 sq mi) or 4.4% is used for agricultural purposes, while 12.33 km^{2} (4.76 sq mi) or 67.0% is forested. Of the rest of the land, 0.75 km^{2} (0.29 sq mi) or 4.1% is settled (buildings or roads), 0.29 km^{2} (0.11 sq mi) or 1.6% is either rivers or lakes and 3.63 km^{2} (1.40 sq mi) or 19.7% is unproductive land.

Of the built up area, housing and buildings made up 0.9% and transportation infrastructure made up 0.3%. Power and water infrastructure as well as other special developed areas made up 2.3% of the area Out of the forested land, 53.8% of the total land area is heavily forested, while 11.4% is covered in small trees and shrubbery and 1.8% is covered with orchards or small clusters of trees. Of the agricultural land, 3.2% is used for growing crops. All the water in the municipality is flowing water. Of the unproductive areas, 11.5% is unproductive vegetation and 8.3% is too rocky for vegetation.

The municipality is located in the Riviera district, on the right bank of the Ticino river.

== Coat of arms ==
The blazon of the municipal coat of arms is Vert a tau cross inverted wavy between two bells or.

== Demographics ==
Iragna has a population (as of December 2020) of 567. As of 2008, 21.7% of the population are resident foreign nationals. Over the last 10 years (1997–2007) the population has changed at a rate of 11.6%. Most of the population (as of 2000) speaks Italian language (449 or 91.4%), with German being second most common (12 or 2.4%) and Serbo-Croatian being third (9 or 1.8%). There are 3 people who speak French and 1 person who speaks Romansh.

As of 2008, the gender distribution of the population was 48.8% male and 51.2% female. The population was made up of 203 Swiss men (35.7% of the population), and 74 (13.0%) non-Swiss men. There were 242 Swiss women (42.6%), and 49 (8.6%) non-Swiss women. Of the population in the municipality 199 or about 40.5% were born in Iragna and lived there in 2000. There were 134 or 27.3% who were born in the same canton, while 33 or 6.7% were born somewhere else in Switzerland, and 122 or 24.8% were born outside of Switzerland.

In 2008 there were 4 live births to Swiss citizens and 1 birth to non-Swiss citizens, and in same time span there were 4 deaths of Swiss citizens and 3 non-Swiss citizen deaths. Ignoring immigration and emigration, the population of Swiss citizens remained the same while the foreign population decreased by 2. There was 1 Swiss man who immigrated back to Switzerland. At the same time, there were 5 non-Swiss men who emigrated from Switzerland to another country and 1 non-Swiss woman who immigrated from another country to Switzerland. The total Swiss population change in 2008 (from all sources, including moves across municipal borders) was a decrease of 3 and the non-Swiss population change was an increase of 6 people. This represents a population growth rate of 0.5%.

The age distribution, as of 2009, in Iragna is; 55 children or 9.7% of the population are between 0 and 9 years old and 66 teenagers or 11.6% are between 10 and 19. Of the adult population, 63 people or 11.1% of the population are between 20 and 29 years old. 91 people or 16.0% are between 30 and 39, 100 people or 17.6% are between 40 and 49, and 70 people or 12.3% are between 50 and 59. The senior population distribution is 46 people or 8.1% of the population are between 60 and 69 years old, 54 people or 9.5% are between 70 and 79, there are 23 people or 4.0% who are over 80.

As of 2000, there were 196 people who were single and never married in the municipality. There were 251 married individuals, 21 widows or widowers and 23 individuals who are divorced.

As of 2000, there were 190 private households in the municipality, and an average of 2.5 persons per household. There were 51 households that consist of only one person and 7 households with five or more people. Out of a total of 194 households that answered this question, 26.3% were households made up of just one person and 5 were adults who lived with their parents. Of the rest of the households, there are 47 married couples without children, 76 married couples with children There were 8 single parents with a child or children. There were 3 households that were made up unrelated people and 4 households that were made some sort of institution or another collective housing.

In 2000 there were 163 single family homes (or 79.1% of the total) out of a total of 206 inhabited buildings. There were 28 multi-family buildings (13.6%), along with 3 multi-purpose buildings that were mostly used for housing (1.5%) and 12 other use buildings (commercial or industrial) that also had some housing (5.8%). Of the single family homes 2 were built before 1919, while 13 were built between 1990 and 2000. The greatest number of single family homes (81) were built between 1919 and 1945.

In 2000 there were 251 apartments in the municipality. The most common apartment size was 4 rooms of which there were 78. There were 13 single room apartments and 74 apartments with five or more rooms. Of these apartments, a total of 190 apartments (75.7% of the total) were permanently occupied, while 55 apartments (21.9%) were seasonally occupied and 6 apartments (2.4%) were empty. As of 2007, the construction rate of new housing units was 5.5 new units per 1000 residents. The vacancy rate for the municipality, in 2008, was 0.38%.

The historical population is given in the following chart:

== Politics ==
In the 2007 federal election the most popular party was the SP which received 33.79% of the vote. The next three most popular parties were the FDP (22.36%), the CVP (20.81%) and the Ticino League (16.25%). In the federal election, a total of 150 votes were cast, and the voter turnout was 44.0%.

In the 2007 Gran Consiglio election, there were a total of 340 registered voters in Iragna, of which 215 or 63.2% voted. 3 blank ballots were cast, leaving 212 valid ballots in the election. The most popular party was the PS which received 68 or 32.1% of the vote. The next three most popular parties were; the PLRT (with 41 or 19.3%), the SSI (with 35 or 16.5%) and the PPD+GenGiova (with 34 or 16.0%).

In the 2007 Consiglio di Stato election, The most popular party was the PS which received 76 or 35.3% of the vote. The next three most popular parties were; the PLRT (with 42 or 19.5%), the PPD (with 35 or 16.3%) and the LEGA (with 34 or 15.8%).

== Economy ==
As of 2007, Iragna had an unemployment rate of 3.77%. As of 2005, there were 20 people employed in the primary economic sector and about 5 businesses involved in this sector. 99 people were employed in the secondary sector and there were 13 businesses in this sector. 39 people were employed in the tertiary sector, with 14 businesses in this sector. There were 239 residents of the municipality who were employed in some capacity, of which females made up 35.6% of the workforce.

In 2008 the total number of full-time equivalent jobs was 109. The number of jobs in the primary sector was 10, all of which were in agriculture. The number of jobs in the secondary sector was 62, of which 27 or (43.5%) were in manufacturing, 11 or (17.7%) were in mining and 24 (38.7%) were in construction. The number of jobs in the tertiary sector was 37. In the tertiary sector; 1 or 2.7% were in wholesale or retail sales or the repair of motor vehicles, 9 or 24.3% were in the movement and storage of goods, 16 or 43.2% were in a hotel or restaurant, 2 or 5.4% were in the information industry, 1 or 2.7% were technical professionals or scientists, 4 or 10.8% were in education.

In 2000, there were 80 workers who commuted into the municipality and 179 workers who commuted away. The municipality is a net exporter of workers, with about 2.2 workers leaving the municipality for every one entering. Of the working population, 3.3% used public transportation to get to work, and 70.7% used a private car.

== Religion ==
From the 2000 census, 418 or 85.1% were Roman Catholic, while 3 or 0.6% belonged to the Swiss Reformed Church. Of the rest of the population, and there were 3 individuals (or about 0.61% of the population) who belonged to another Christian church. There were 20 (or about 4.07% of the population) who were Islamic. 29 (or about 5.91% of the population) belonged to no church, are agnostic or atheist, and 18 individuals (or about 3.67% of the population) did not answer the question.

== Education ==
In Iragna about 177 or (36.0%) of the population have completed non-mandatory upper secondary education, and 28 or (5.7%) have completed additional higher education (either university or a Fachhochschule). Of the 28 who completed tertiary schooling, 89.3% were Swiss men, 7.1% were Swiss women.

In Iragna there were a total of 95 students (as of 2009). The Ticino education system provides up to three years of non-mandatory kindergarten and in Iragna there were 17 children in kindergarten. The primary school program lasts for five years and includes both a standard school and a special school. In the municipality, 27 students attended the standard primary schools and 1 student attended the special school. In the lower secondary school system, students either attend a two-year middle school followed by a two-year pre-apprenticeship or they attend a four-year program to prepare for higher education. There were 25 students in the two-year middle school, while 6 students were in the four-year advanced program.

The upper secondary school includes several options, but at the end of the upper secondary program, a student will be prepared to enter a trade or to continue on to a university or college. In Ticino, vocational students may either attend school while working on their internship or apprenticeship (which takes three or four years) or may attend school followed by an internship or apprenticeship (which takes one year as a full-time student or one and a half to two years as a part-time student). There were 4 vocational students who were attending school full-time and 14 who attend part-time.

The professional program lasts three years and prepares a student for a job in engineering, nursing, computer science, business, tourism and similar fields. There was 1 student in the professional program.

As of 2000, there were 24 students from Iragna who attended schools outside the municipality.
