= Delrio =

- Language: Galician, Portuguese, Spanish

Origin
- Region of origin: Galician, Portuguese, Spanish

Other names
- Variant forms: Ríos, Rios, de Ríos, de los Ríos, de Rios, de los Rios, Río, Rio, del Río, del Rio

Delrio is a surname and may refer to:

- Graziano Delrio (born 1960), Italian medical doctor and politician
- Martin Delrio (1551–1608), Jesuit theologian
- Kyanna Delrio, a dateable character in the dating simulation videogame HuniePop

== See also ==
- Del Rio (disambiguation)
- Ríos (disambiguation)
