= Cresciano =

- Former municipality
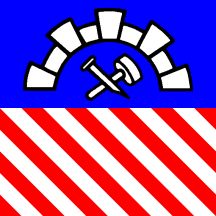
- Flag Coat of arms
- Location of Cresciano
- Location within Switzerland Location within Canton of Ticino
- Coordinates: 46°17′N 9°00′E
- Country: Switzerland
- Canton: Ticino
- District: Riviera

Area
  - Total: 17.23 km^{2} (6.65 sq mi)
- Elevation: 260 m (850 ft)

Population (December 2004)
  - Total: 593
  - Density: 34.4/km^{2} (89.1/sq mi)
- Time zone: UTC+01:00 (CET)
  - Summer (DST): UTC+02:00 (CEST)
- Postal code: 6705
- SFOS number: 5283
- ISO 3166 code: CH-TI
- Surrounded by: Arvigo (GR), Claro, Lodrino, Moleno, Osogna, Preonzo, San Vittore (GR)
- Website: cresciano.ch

Cresciano is a former municipality in the district of Riviera in the canton of Ticino in Switzerland.

On 2 April 2017, the former municipalities of Iragna, Lodrino, and Osogna merged into the new municipality of Riviera.

== History ==
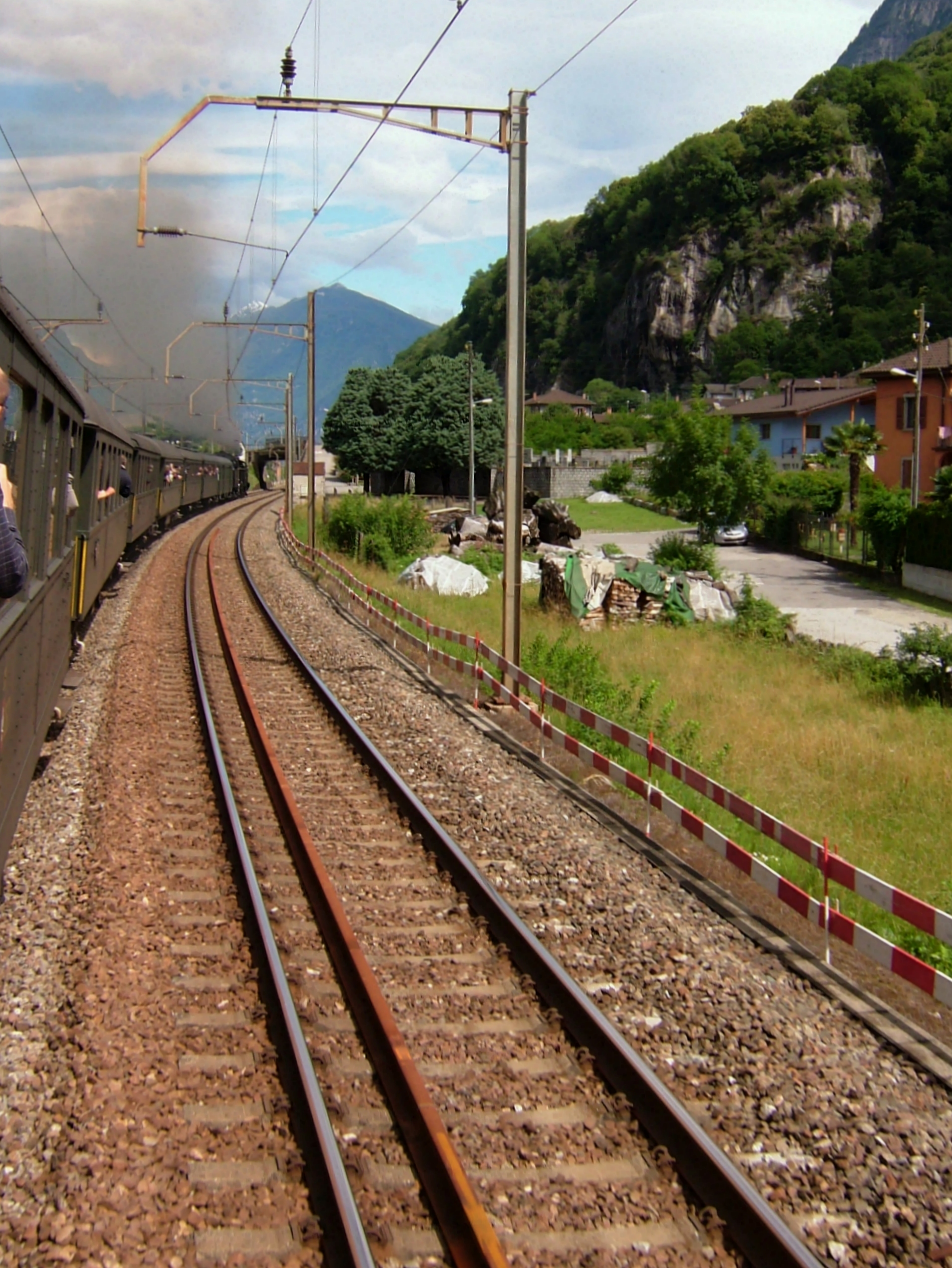
Gotthard railway at Cresciano

Cresciano is first mentioned in 1269 as Crazano.

During the construction of the Gotthard railway in the 19th century, traces of a Bronze Age settlement were found. An Imperial charter from 978 mentions a cortis Crissianicum owned by the monastery of San Pietro in Ciel d'Oro in Pavia. Like the neighboring communities, Cresciano was owned by the Cathedral of Milan. In the 14th century, it was placed, together with Osogna and Claro, under the jurisdiction of a representative of the Visconti. In the 15th century, Milan granted the village the right to choose a community leader.

The parish church of San Vincenzo was first used in the 13th century.

Starting around 1880, granite quarries opened in the valley. These played an important role in the economy of Cresciano and its neighboring towns.

== Geography ==
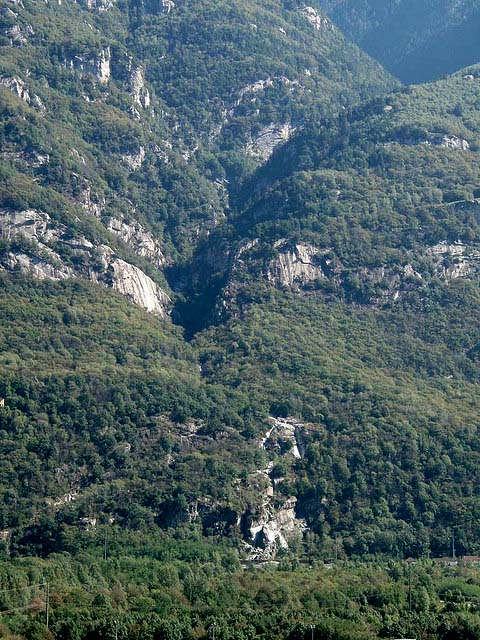
Val Cresciano above the municipality

Cresciano has an area, as of 1997, of 17.23 square kilometers (6.65 sq mi). Of this area, 0.77 km^{2} (0.30 sq mi) or 4.5% is used for agricultural purposes, while 10 km^{2} (3.9 sq mi), or 58.0% is forested. Of the rest of the land, 0.52 km^{2} (0.20 sq mi) or 3.0% is settled (buildings or roads), 0.35 km^{2} (0.14 sq mi) or 2.0% is either rivers or lakes and 5.25 km^{2} (2.03 sq mi) or 30.5% is unproductive land.

Of the built-up area, housing and buildings made up 0.9% and transportation infrastructure made up 1.0%. Out of the forested land, 48.9% of the total land area is heavily forested and 1.6% is covered with orchards or small clusters of trees. Of the agricultural land, 3.2% is used for growing crops. All the water in the municipality is flowing water. Of the unproductive areas, 12.9% is unproductive vegetation and 17.5% is too rocky for vegetation.

== Coat of arms ==
The blazon of the municipal coat of arms is Per fess azure an arch of stone blocks, a sledge hammer, and a chisel in saltire all argent and gules seven bendlets argent.

== Demographics ==
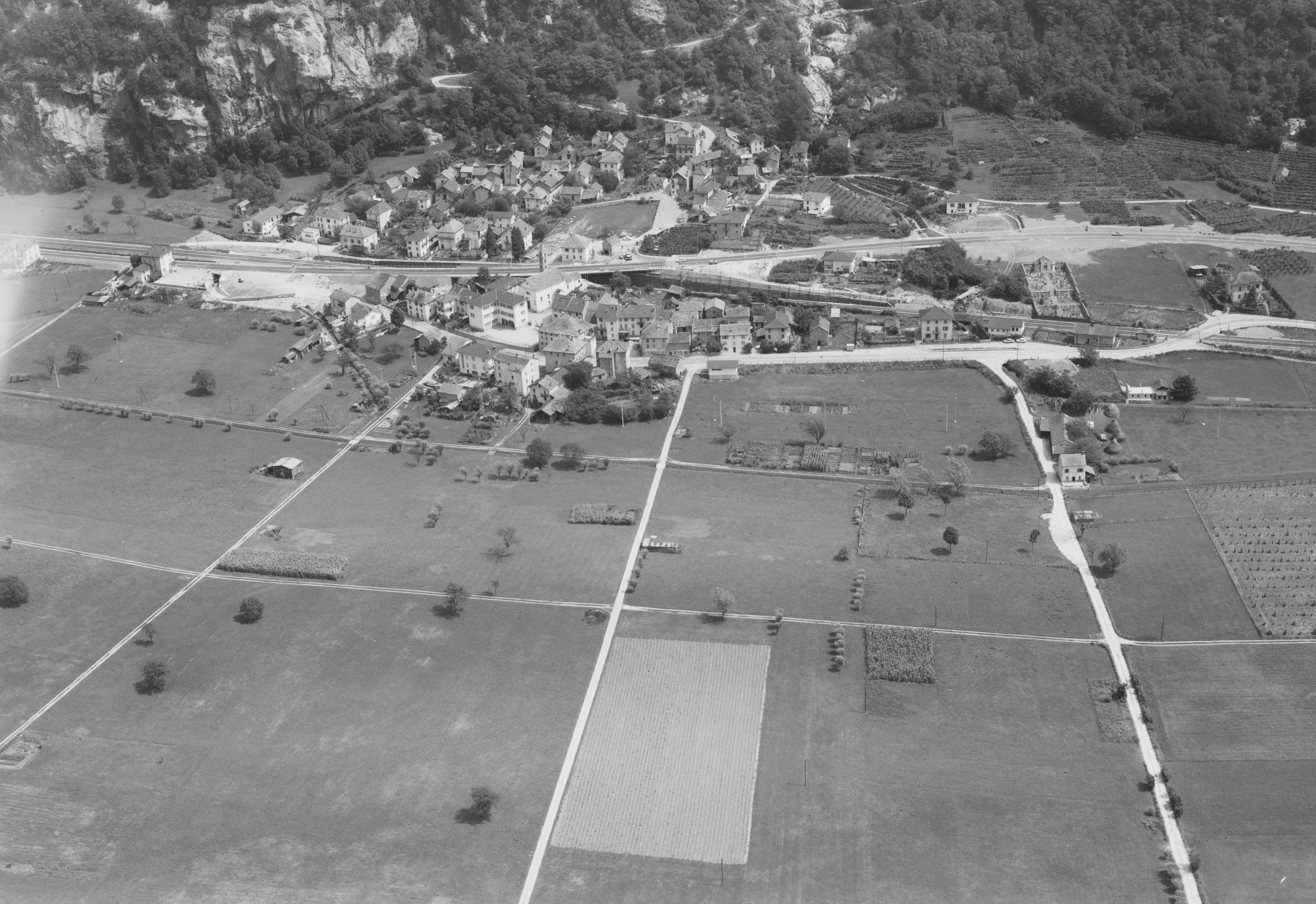
Aerial view (1964)

Cresciano has a population (as of December 2020) of 699. As of 2008, 31.3% of the population are resident foreign nationals. Over the last 10 years (1997–2007) the population has changed at a rate of 5.9%. Most of the population (as of 2000) speaks Italian (491 or 83.6%), with German being second most common (31 or 5.3%) and Portuguese being third (30 or 5.1%). There are 6 people who speak French and people who speak Romansh.

As of 2008, the gender distribution of the population was 51.6% male and 48.4% female. The population was made up of 204 Swiss men (32.6% of the population), and 119 (19.0%) non-Swiss men. There were 216 Swiss women (34.5%), and 87 (13.9%) non-Swiss women. Of the population in the municipality 208 or about 35.4% were born in Cresciano and lived there in 2000. There were 165 or 28.1% who were born in the same canton, 51 or 8.7% were born somewhere else in Switzerland, and 146 or 24.9% were born outside of Switzerland.

In 2008 there were 5 live births to Swiss citizens and 2 births to non-Swiss citizens, and in the same time span there were 4 deaths of Swiss citizens. Ignoring immigration and emigration, the population of Swiss citizens increased by 1 while the foreign population increased by 2. 2 Swiss women immigrated back to Switzerland. At the same time, there were 6 non-Swiss men and 7 non-Swiss women who immigrated from another country to Switzerland. The total Swiss population change in 2008 (from all sources, including moves across municipal borders) was a decrease of 4 and the non-Swiss population change was an increase of 11 people. This represents a population growth rate of 1.1%.

The age distribution, as of 2009, in Cresciano is; 45 children or 7.2% of the population are between 0 and 9 years old and 55 teenagers or 8.8% are between 10 and 19. Of the adult population, 85 people or 13.6% of the population are between 20 and 29 years old. 111 people or 17.7% are between 30 and 39, 106 people or 16.9% are between 40 and 49, and 78 people or 12.5% are between 50 and 59. The senior population distribution is 75 people or 12.0% of the population are between 60 and 69 years old, 48 people or 7.7% are between 70 and 79, there are 23 people or 3.7% are over 80.

As of 2000, 227 people were single and never married in the municipality. There were 291 married individuals, 42 widows or widowers and 27 individuals who are divorced.

As of 2000, there were 255 private households in the municipality, and an average of 2.3 persons per household. 83 households consist of only one person and 14 households with five or more people. Out of a total of 256 households that answered this question, 32.4% were households made up of just one person and 5 were adults who lived with their parents. Of the rest of the households, there are 63 married couples without children, 82 married couples with children. There were 13 single parents with a child or children. 9 households were made up of unrelated people and 1 household was made of some sort of institution or another collective housing.

In 2000 there were 124 single-family homes (or 70.5% of the total) out of a total of 176 inhabited buildings. There were 41 multi-family buildings (23.3%), along with 3 multi-purpose buildings that were mostly used for housing (1.7%) and 8 other use buildings (commercial or industrial) that also had some housing (4.5%). Of the single-family homes 5 were built before 1919, while 7 were built between 1990 and 2000. The greatest number of single-family homes (46) were built between 1919 and 1945.

In 2000 there were 300 apartments in the municipality. The most common apartment size was 4 rooms of which there were 105. There were 6 single-room apartments and 58 apartments with five or more rooms. Of these apartments, a total of 252 apartments (84.0% of the total) were permanently occupied, while 43 apartments (14.3%) were seasonally occupied and 5 apartments (1.7%) were empty. As of 2007, the construction rate of new housing units was 6.5 new units per 1000 residents. The vacancy rate for the municipality, in 2008, was 1.57%.

The historical population is given in the following chart:

== Politics ==
In the 2007 federal election the most popular party was the CVP which received 34.63% of the vote. The next three most popular parties were the FDP (21.76%), the Ticino League (19.95%) and the SP (14.87%). In the federal election, a total of 140 votes were cast, and the voter turnout was 40.5%.

In the 2007 Gran Consiglio election, there were a total of 350 registered voters in Cresciano, of which 213 or 60.9% voted. 4 blank ballots were cast, leaving 209 valid ballots in the election. The most popular party was the PLRT which received 49 or 23.4% of the vote. The next three most popular parties were; the PPD+GenGiova (with 48 or 23.0%), the LEGA (with 43 or 20.6%) and the PS (with 34 or 16.3%).

In the 2007 Consiglio di Stato election, 2 blank ballots were cast, leaving 211 valid ballots in the election. The most popular party was the LEGA which received 55 or 26.1% of the vote. The next three most popular parties were; the PPD (with 48 or 22.7%), the PLRT (with 41 or 19.4%) and the PS (with 40 or 19.0%).

== Economy ==
As of 2007, Cresciano had an unemployment rate of 5.99%. As of 2005, there were 12 people employed in the primary economic sector and about 4 businesses involved in this sector. 58 people were employed in the secondary sector and there were 7 businesses in this sector. 49 people were employed in the tertiary sector, with 13 businesses in this sector. There were 235 residents of the municipality who were employed in some capacity, of which females made up 37.9% of the workforce.

In 2008 the total number of full-time equivalent jobs was 105. The number of jobs in the primary sector was 8, all of which were in agriculture. The number of jobs in the secondary sector was 75, of which 14 (18.7%) were in manufacturing, 47 (62.7%) were in mining and 14 (18.7%) were in construction. The number of jobs in the tertiary sector was 22. In the tertiary sector; 2 or 9.1% were in wholesale or retail sales or the repair of motor vehicles, 7 or 31.8% were in a hotel or restaurant, 7 or 31.8% were in education.

In 2000, 98 workers commuted into the municipality and 174 workers who commuted away. The municipality is a net exporter of workers, with about 1.8 workers leaving the municipality for everyone entering. Of the working population, 4.7% used public transportation to get to work, and 76.6% used a private car.

== Religion ==
From the 2000 census, 476 or 81.1% were Roman Catholic, while 22 or 3.7% belonged to the Swiss Reformed Church. Of the rest of the population, there were 13 members of an Orthodox church (or about 2.21% of the population), there were 5 individuals (or about 0.85% of the population) who belonged to the Christian Catholic Church, and there were 9 individuals (or about 1.53% of the population) who belonged to another Christian church. There were 5 (or about 0.85% of the population) who were Islamic. 33 (or about 5.62% of the population) belonged to no church, are agnostic or atheist, and 24 individuals (or about 4.09% of the population) did not answer the question.

== Education ==
In Cresciano about 232 or (39.5%) of the population have completed non-mandatory upper secondary education, and 22 or (3.7%) have completed additional higher education (either university or a Fachhochschule). Of the 22 who completed tertiary schooling, 45.5% were Swiss men, 31.8% were Swiss women.

In Cresciano there were a total of 94 students (as of 2009). The Ticino education system provides up to three years of non-mandatory kindergarten and in Cresciano there were 15 children in kindergarten. The primary school program lasts for five years and includes both a standard school and a special school. In the municipality, 16 students attended the standard primary schools and 4 students attended the special school. In the lower secondary school system, students either attend a two-year middle school followed by a two-year pre-apprenticeship or they attend a four-year program to prepare for higher education. There were 30 students in the two-year middle school, while 9 students were in the four-year advanced program.

The upper secondary school includes several options, but at the end of the upper secondary program, a student will be prepared to enter a trade or to continue on to a university or college. In Ticino, vocational students may either attend school while working on their internship or apprenticeship (which takes three or four years) or may attend school followed by an internship or apprenticeship (which takes one year as a full-time student or one and a half to two years as a part-time student). 7 vocational students were attending school full-time and 10 who attended part-time.

The professional program lasts three years and prepares a student for a job in engineering, nursing, computer science, business, tourism and similar fields. There were 3 students in the professional program.

As of 2000, 2 students in Cresciano came from another municipality, while 44 residents attended schools outside the municipality.
