= Osogna =

- Former municipality
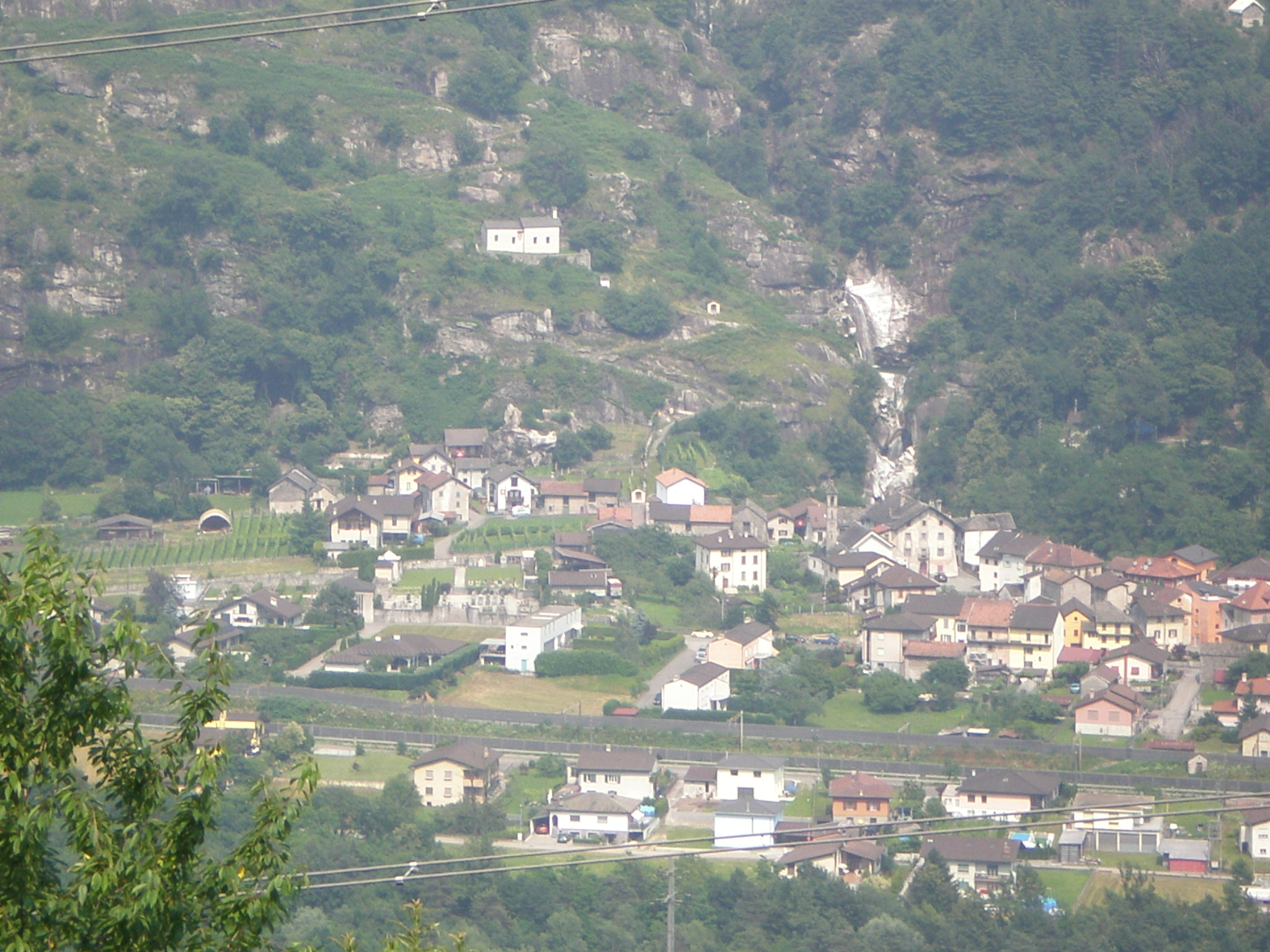
- Osogna village

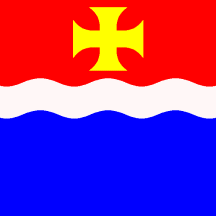
- Flag Coat of arms
- Location of Osogna
- Location within Switzerland Location within Canton of Ticino
- Coordinates: 46°19′N 8°59′E
- Country: Switzerland
- Canton: Ticino
- District: Riviera

Area
  - Total: 18.99 km^{2} (7.33 sq mi)
- Elevation: 274 m (899 ft)

Population (December 2004)
  - Total: 985
  - Density: 51.9/km^{2} (134/sq mi)
- Time zone: UTC+01:00 (CET)
  - Summer (DST): UTC+02:00 (CEST)
- Postal code: 6703
- SFOS number: 5286
- ISO 3166 code: CH-TI
- Surrounded by: Lodrino, Arvigo (GR), Cauco (GR), Biasca, Iragna
- Website: SFSO statistics

Osogna is a former municipality in the district of Riviera in the canton of Ticino in Switzerland.

On 2 April 2017 the former municipalities of Osogna, Cresciano, Iragna and Lodrino merged into the new municipality of Riviera.

== History ==
Osogna is first mentioned around 1210–58 as Usonia.

Roman graves have been found near the Nala creek.

During the Middle Ages Osogna was under the spiritual and secular power of Milan Cathedral. During the reign of the Visconti in the 14th century, Osogna, Claro and Cresciano were combined under the jurisdiction of a governor. The town rights were confirmed in 1400. Between 1573 and 1798 Osogna was the residence of the Riviera Vogts and the center of government for the valley. After 1798, it was the seat of the district government.

The parish church of SS Felino e Gratiniano was built before the 13th century and was renovated in 1979–84. The other churches in the municipality are the church of S. Pietà from the 16th century and S. Maria del Castello from the 18th century.

Since the end of the 19th century, granite has been quarried in Osogna. In the 1960s, factories and warehouses began to move into the municipality. In 2005, the manufacturing sector provided over three-fifths of the jobs in Osogna. More than two-thirds of the population of Osogna commute to Biasca and Bellinzona.

=== The Patriziato (Patriciate) of Osogna ===
This public institution is much older than the Municipality. The burghers of Osogna belong to this community which goes back to the vicina of the Middle Ages. All the mountain forests and pastures belong to this institution. These pastures were used during the seasonal migration of the cattle (static transhumance). Old family names of Osogna are Guidi, Malaguerra, Mattei, Pellanda.

=== The Parrocchia (Parish) of Osogna ===
The Catholics of Osogna belong to this parish. The parish church of the Saints Gratiniano and Felino was built in 1498. There are two other churches in Osogna: the church of Santa Maria (Holy Mary) built on the foundations of an old castle (end of the Middle Ages) and the church of Santa Pietà (1729).

== Geography ==
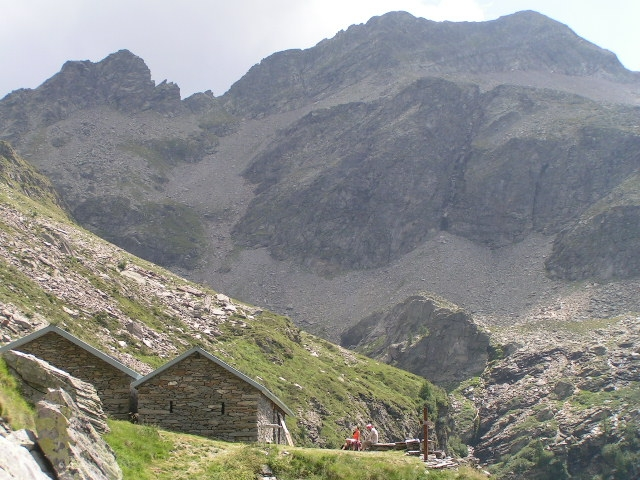
Alpine shelter at Rifugio d'Örz above the Osogna valley

Osogna has an area, as of 1997, of 18.99 square kilometers (7.33 sq mi). Of this area, 0.4 km^{2} (0.15 sq mi) or 2.1% is used for agricultural purposes, while 11.51 km^{2} (4.44 sq mi) or 60.6% is forested. Of the rest of the land, 0.85 km^{2} (0.33 sq mi) or 4.5% is settled (buildings or roads), 0.2 km^{2} (0.077 sq mi) or 1.1% is either rivers or lakes and 5.7 km^{2} (2.2 sq mi) or 30.0% is unproductive land.

Of the built up area, housing and buildings made up 1.3% and transportation infrastructure made up 1.9%. Out of the forested land, 51.0% of the total land area is heavily forested and 2.3% is covered with orchards or small clusters of trees. Of the agricultural land, 0.8% is used for growing crops and 1.3% is used for alpine pastures. All the water in the municipality is flowing water. Of the unproductive areas, 15.9% is unproductive vegetation and 14.1% is too rocky for vegetation.

The municipality is located in the Riviera district south of Biasca on the left bank of the Ticino river. It is located 15 km (9.3 mi) north of Bellinzona and 5 km (3.1 mi) south of Biasca. The highest mountain is the Torrone d'Orza (2,952 m (9,685 ft)).

The rocks consist mainly of gneisses and granites (three quarries were operated in Osogna). The vegetation is composed primarily of deciduous trees (beeches, chestnut trees) up to about 900 m (3,000 ft) and then evergreen trees (spruces and larches). Chestnuts were an important food for the population.

== Coat of arms ==
The blazon of the municipal coat of arms is Per fess gules and azure overall a fess wavy argent an in chief a cross pattee or.

== Demographics ==
Osogna has a population (as of December 2020) of 1,060. As of 2008, 36.2% of the population are resident foreign nationals. Over the last 10 years (1997–2007) the population has changed at a rate of 4.3%. Most of the population (as of 2000) speaks Italian (803 or 85.3%), with Portuguese being second most common (34 or 3.6%) and German being third (32 or 3.4%). There are 4 people who speak French.

As of 2008, the gender distribution of the population was 52.3% male and 47.7% female. The population was made up of 340 Swiss men (32.7% of the population), and 204 (19.6%) non-Swiss men. There were 344 Swiss women (33.1%), and 152 (14.6%) non-Swiss women. Of the population in the municipality 323 or about 34.3% were born in Osogna and lived there in 2000. There were 199 or 21.1% who were born in the same canton, while 53 or 5.6% were born somewhere else in Switzerland, and 352 or 37.4% were born outside of Switzerland.

In 2008 there were 4 live births to Swiss citizens and 4 births to non-Swiss citizens, and in same time span there were 4 deaths of Swiss citizens and 3 non-Swiss citizen deaths. Ignoring immigration and emigration, the population of Swiss citizens remained the same while the foreign population increased by 1. There was 1 Swiss man and 1 Swiss woman who emigrated from Switzerland. At the same time, there were 9 non-Swiss men and 3 non-Swiss women who immigrated from another country to Switzerland. The total Swiss population change in 2008 (from all sources, including moves across municipal borders) was an increase of 15 and the non-Swiss population change was a decrease of 11 people. This represents a population growth rate of 0.4%.

The age distribution, as of 2009, in Osogna is; 104 children or 10.0% of the population are between 0 and 9 years old and 128 teenagers or 12.3% are between 10 and 19. Of the adult population, 120 people or 11.5% of the population are between 20 and 29 years old. 151 people or 14.5% are between 30 and 39, 188 people or 18.1% are between 40 and 49, and 124 people or 11.9% are between 50 and 59. The senior population distribution is 105 people or 10.1% of the population are between 60 and 69 years old, 76 people or 7.3% are between 70 and 79, there are 44 people or 4.2% who are over 80.

As of 2000, there were 373 people who were single and never married in the municipality. There were 490 married individuals, 48 widows or widowers and 30 individuals who are divorced.

As of 2000, there were 352 private households in the municipality, and an average of 2.5 persons per household. There were 93 households that consist of only one person and 27 households with five or more people. Out of a total of 357 households that answered this question, 26.1% were households made up of just one person and 5 were adults who lived with their parents. Of the rest of the households, there are 75 married couples without children, 146 married couples with children. There were 28 single parents with a child or children. There were 5 households that were made up unrelated people and 5 households that were made some sort of institution or another collective housing.

In 2000 there were 190 single family homes (or 68.3% of the total) out of a total of 278 inhabited buildings. There were 62 multi-family buildings (22.3%), along with 12 multi-purpose buildings that were mostly used for housing (4.3%) and 14 other use buildings (commercial or industrial) that also had some housing (5.0%). Of the single family homes 6 were built before 1919, while 23 were built between 1990 and 2000. The greatest number of single family homes (48) were built between 1919 and 1945.

In 2000 there were 423 apartments in the municipality. The most common apartment size was 4 rooms of which there were 157. There were 8 single room apartments and 100 apartments with five or more rooms. Of these apartments, a total of 350 apartments (82.7% of the total) were permanently occupied, while 49 apartments (11.6%) were seasonally occupied and 24 apartments (5.7%) were empty. As of 2007, the construction rate of new housing units was 2.9 new units per 1000 residents. The vacancy rate for the municipality, in 2008, was 0.45%.

The historical population is given in the following chart:

== Politics ==
In the 2007 federal election the most popular party was the FDP which received 37.69% of the vote. The next three most popular parties were the CVP (28.63%), the Ticino League (12.82%) and the SP (7.95%). In the federal election, a total of 273 votes were cast, and the voter turnout was 52.5%.

In the 2007 Gran Consiglio election, there were a total of 522 registered voters in Osogna, of which 347 or 66.5% voted. 5 blank ballots and 4 null ballots were cast, leaving 338 valid ballots in the election. The most popular party was the PLRT which received 97 or 28.7% of the vote. The next three most popular parties were; the PPD+GenGiova (with 80 or 23.7%), the SSI (with 50 or 14.8%) and the LEGA (with 44 or 13.0%).

In the 2007 Consiglio di Stato election, 4 blank ballots were cast, leaving 343 valid ballots in the election. The most popular party was the PLRT which received 102 or 29.7% of the vote. The next three most popular parties were; the PPD (with 79 or 23.0%), the LEGA (with 62 or 18.1%) and the SSI (with 47 or 13.7%).

== Economy ==
As of 2007, Osogna had an unemployment rate of 4.59%. As of 2005, there were 5 people employed in the primary economic sector and about 2 businesses involved in this sector. 131 people were employed in the secondary sector and there were 13 businesses in this sector. 80 people were employed in the tertiary sector, with 28 businesses in this sector. There were 422 residents of the municipality who were employed in some capacity, of which females made up 31.0% of the workforce.

In 2008 the total number of full-time equivalent jobs was 229. The number of jobs in the primary sector was 4, all of which were in agriculture. The number of jobs in the secondary sector was 181, of which 33 or (18.2%) were in manufacturing and 148 (81.8%) were in construction. The number of jobs in the tertiary sector was 44. In the tertiary sector; 20 or 45.5% were in wholesale or retail sales or the repair of motor vehicles, 5 or 11.4% were in a hotel or restaurant, 3 or 6.8% were technical professionals or scientists, 8 or 18.2% were in education and 2 or 4.5% were in health care.

In 2000, there were 196 workers who commuted into the municipality and 294 workers who commuted away. The municipality is a net exporter of workers, with about 1.5 workers leaving the municipality for every one entering. Of the working population, 9.2% used public transportation to get to work, and 63.3% used a private car.

== Religion ==
From the 2000 census, 752 or 79.9% were Roman Catholic, while 18 or 1.9% belonged to the Swiss Reformed Church. Of the rest of the population, there were 17 members of an Orthodox church (or about 1.81% of the population), and there were 2 individuals (or about 0.21% of the population) who belonged to another Christian church. There were 54 (or about 5.74% of the population) who were Islamic. 68 (or about 7.23% of the population) belonged to no church, are agnostic or atheist, and 30 individuals (or about 3.19% of the population) did not answer the question.

== Education ==
In Osogna about 348 or (37.0%) of the population have completed non-mandatory upper secondary education, and 63 or (6.7%) have completed additional higher education (either university or a Fachhochschule). Of the 63 who completed tertiary schooling, 61.9% were Swiss men, 20.6% were Swiss women, 14.3% were non-Swiss men.

In Osogna there were a total of 196 students (as of 2009). The Ticino education system provides up to three years of non-mandatory kindergarten and in Osogna there were 27 children in kindergarten. The primary school program lasts for five years and includes both a standard school and a special school. In the municipality, 56 students attended the standard primary schools and 4 students attended the special school. In the lower secondary school system, students either attend a two-year middle school followed by a two-year pre-apprenticeship or they attend a four-year program to prepare for higher education. There were 62 students in the two-year middle school, while 9 students were in the four-year advanced program.

The upper secondary school includes several options, but at the end of the upper secondary program, a student will be prepared to enter a trade or to continue on to a university or college. In Ticino, vocational students may either attend school while working on their internship or apprenticeship (which takes three or four years) or may attend school followed by an internship or apprenticeship (which takes one year as a full-time student or one and a half to two years as a part-time student). There were 9 vocational students who were attending school full-time and 28 who attend part-time.

The professional program lasts three years and prepares a student for a job in engineering, nursing, computer science, business, tourism and similar fields. There was 1 student in the professional program.

As of 2000, there were 87 students from Osogna who attended schools outside the municipality.
