= Ribera =

Ribera is a Spanish word that translates into "the basin of a river", and may refer to:

== Locations ==
- Ribera, Agrigento, a comune in the province of Agrigento, Sicily, Italy
- Ribera, Costa Rica, a former port on Aranjuez River
- Ribera Alta, Álava, a municipality in the province of Álava, Basque Country, Spain
- Ribera Alta (comarca), a comarca in the province of Valencia, Spain
- Ribera Baixa, a comarca in the province of Valencia, Spain
- Ribera Baja, the Spanish name of the municipality of Ribera Baja/Erribera Beitia in the province of Álava, Basque Country, Spain
- La Ribera, a municipality in the Principality of Asturias, Spain
- Ribera del Duero, a wine-producing region and Denominación de Origen in the autonomous community of Castile and León, Spain
- Ribera d'Ebre, a comarca in Catalonia, Spain
- Ribera del Fresno, a municipality in the province of Badajoz, Extremadura, Spain
- Ribera d'Ondara, a municipality in the comarca of the Segarra, Catalonia, Spain
- Ribera d'Urgellet, a municipality in the comarca of the Alt Urgell, Catalonia, Spain
- Ribera, New Mexico, a small village in northern New Mexico, U.S.
- Ribera of Navarre, the flat region around the Ebro at the south of Navarre, Spain

== Surname ==
- Eduarda Ribera (born 2004), Brazilian cross-country skier
- Francisco Ribera (1537–1591), Spanish Jesuit theologian
- Juan de Ribera (1532–1611), Archbishop of Valencia
- Juan de Ribera (1588–1666), Bishop of Santa Cruz de la Sierra
- Jusepe de Ribera (1591–1652), Spanish painter in Italy
- Juan Antonio Ribera (1779–1860), Spanish neoclassic painter
- Teresa Ribera (born 1969), Spanish jurist, professor and politician
- Marta Ribera (born 1971), Spanish actress
- Alejandra Ribera (born 1973), Canadian singer-songwriter
- Juan José Ribera (born 1980), Chilean footballer
- María Ribera (born 1986), Spanish rugby player
- Carolina Ribera (born 1990), Bolivian dentist and lawyer
- Joshua Ribera (1995–2013), known as Depzman, British rapper

== Other ==
- Palacio de la Ribera, a former palace in Valladolid, Castile and León, Spain
- Ribera Steakhouse, a Japanese steakhouse.

== See also ==
- Ribero (disambiguation)
- Rivera (disambiguation)
- Riviera (disambiguation)
- Rio (disambiguation)
- Ríos (disambiguation)
