= Rio (surname) =

Rio is a surname which may refer to:

- Al Rio (1962–2012), Brazilian comic book artist
- Alexis-François Rio (1797–1874), French author and art critic
- Frank Rio (1895–1935), Co-founder and crime boss of the Chicago Outfit
- Joannes del Rio, clergyman
- Michel Rio (born 1945), French writer and novelist
- Michel Rio (footballer) (born 1963), French former footballer
- Neiphiu Rio (born 1950), Indian politician
- Patrice Rio (born 1948), former French footballer
- Ricardo Rio (born 1972), is a Portuguese economist and politician, current mayor of Braga
- Rui Rio (born 1957), Is a Portuguese economist and politician, was Mayor of Porto
- Zhaleo Rio, 21st century Indian politician, brother of Neiphiu Rio

== See also ==
- Riario an Italian noble family
- Rio (disambiguation)
- Del Rio (disambiguation)
- Ríos (disambiguation)
