= Riviera Airport (Switzerland) =

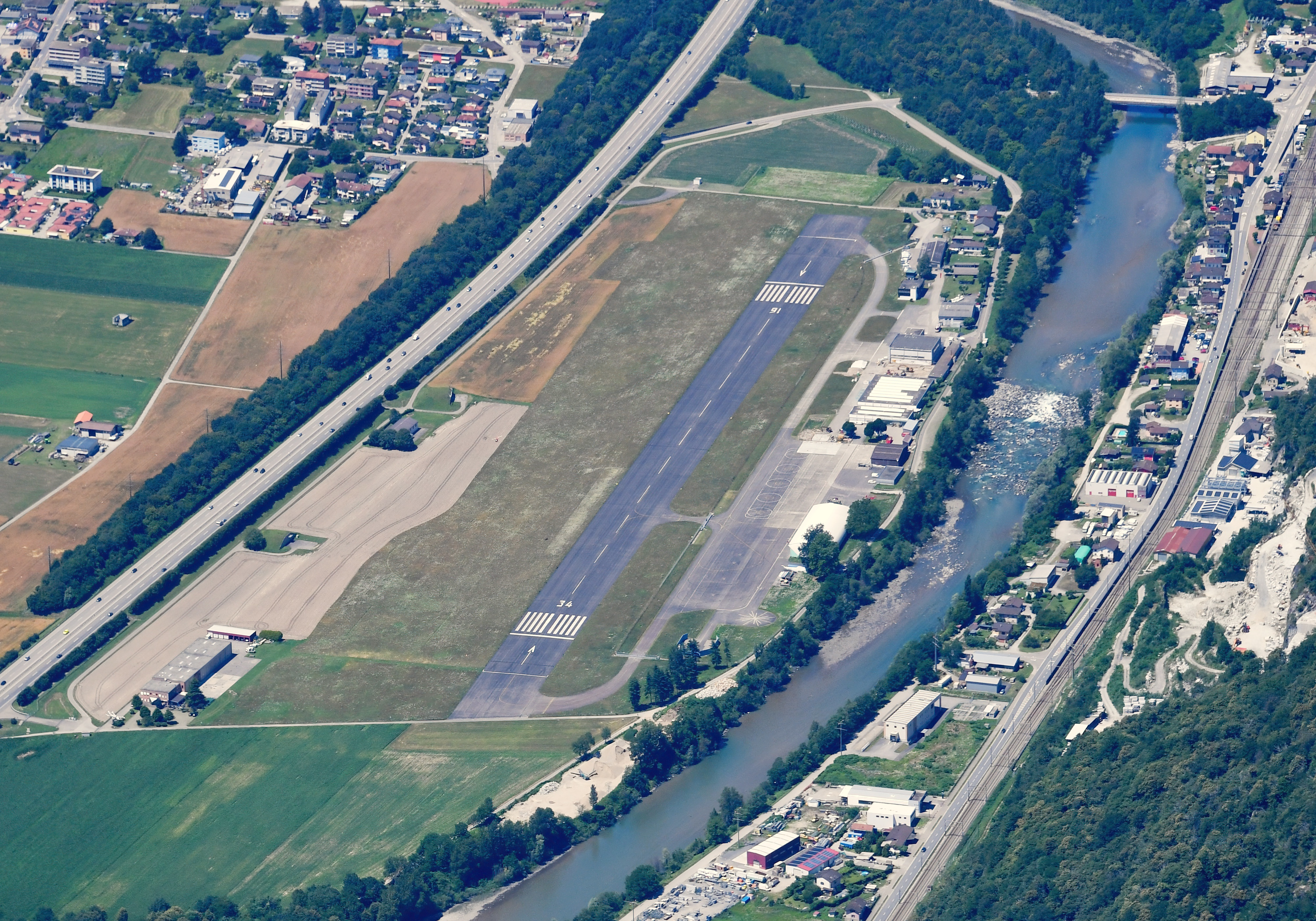
- IATA: none; ICAO: LSPR

Summary
- Airport type: Civilian
- Serves: Riviera, Ticino, Switzerland
- Occupants: RUAG; Karen SA; Heli TV
- Coordinates: 46°17.6534′N 8°59.5716′E
- Website: www.riviera-airport.swiss

Map
- Location in Switzerland
- Sources: GCM

Riviera Airport is a small civilian airport at Riviera, Ticino, on the site of the former Lodrino Air Base (German: Militärflugplatz Lodrino), a military airfield of the Swiss Air Force.

== History ==
=== As Lodrino Air Base ===
The airfield was used in the past for fighter aircraft such as de Havilland Venom, Hawker Hunter and de Havilland Vampire, and for various liaison aircraft of the Swiss Air Force. The A3 motorway was constructed such that it could if necessary be used as a runway. This was also practised in exercises, Strada 91 being the last such exercise.

Lodrino was used as the alternate airport for Locarno Air Base. PC-7 basic trainers also practised circuits here and PC-6 loaded paratroopers (Armee-Aufklärungsdetachement 10, Fallschirmaufklärer Kompanie 17) for jumps over the Locarno area. The interior of the tower was partially dismantled in 2010 and the building was taken over by the Swiss Drone Center and various other drone-related companies.

=== As Riviera Airport ===
The airport is no longer operated by the Swiss Air Force; local military flights are now coordinated by Locarno Air Base. RUAG Aviation maintenance operates the centre for maintenance of propeller aircraft including the Pilatus PC-6 and PC-7. Formerly serviced types include the Eurocopter EC635, ADS-95, and Pilatus PC-9. Other base operators include Heli TV which operates local cargo flights, Karen SA which operates passenger flights, a maintenance base for Leonardo Helicopters, pilot and technical training (for engineers).

The airport was transferred to a new civilian entity, Riviera Airport, on 6 January 2023. From July 2023, the ICAO location indicator LSPR replaced both LSML and LSXR. Visiting fixed-wing traffic is only permitted with authorization from the operator.

== See also ==
- Military significance of Switzerland's motorways
