= Rivera (disambiguation) =

Rivera may refer to:

== Arts and entertainment ==
- Rivera (album), a 2001 album by Jerry Rivera

== People ==
- Rivera (surname), people with the surname
- Rivera (given name):
  - José Rivera Indarte (1814–1845), Argentine poet and journalist

== Places ==
- Rivera, Buenos Aires, a town in Buenos Aires Province, Argentina
- Rivera, Huila, Colombia
- Rivera, France
- Rivera, Italy
- Rivera, Switzerland
  - Rivera-Bironico railway station
- Rivera Department, Uruguay
  - Rivera, capital of that department
- Pico Rivera, California

== See also ==
- Ribera (disambiguation)
- Riviera (disambiguation)
- Riva (disambiguation)
- Rio (disambiguation)
- Ríos (disambiguation)
