= Luis Rivera =

Luis Rivera may refer to:

- Luis Rivera (long jumper) (born 1987), Mexican long jumper
- Luis Rivera (gymnast) (born 1986), Puerto Rican gymnast
- Luis Rivera (infielder) (born 1964), former player and a coach in Major League Baseball
- Luis Rivera (pitcher) (born 1978), MLB pitcher
- Luis Antonio Rivera (1930–2023), Puerto Rican comedian
- Luis Collazo Rivera, Puerto Rican politician, former mayor of Toa Alta
- Luis Daniel Rivera (politician), Puerto Rican politician, former member of the Puerto Rican senate
- Luis Guillermo Rivera (born 1975), Colombian footballer
- Luis Mariano Rivera (1906–2002), Venezuelan singer, composer, poet and dramatist
- Luis Muñoz Rivera (1859–1916), Puerto Rican politician or the park named after him
- Luis Padrón Rivera (1892–1960), Puerto Rican politician
- Ramón Luis Rivera (born 1929), former mayor of the city of Bayamón
- Luis Castro Rivera (born 1991), Puerto Rican high jumper

== See also ==
- Luis (disambiguation)
- Rivera (disambiguation)
