= Eduardo Rivera =

Eduardo Rivera may refer to:

- Eduardo Rivera (baseball) (born 2003), Puerto Rican baseball player
- Eduardo Rivera (footballer) (born 1951), Uruguayan football manager
- Eduardo Rivera Pérez (born 1972), Mexican politician, municipal president of Puebla in 2011–2014

== See also ==
- Rivera (surname)
