= Juan Rivera =

Juan Rivera may refer to:

- Juan Rivera (explorer) (fl. 1765), Spanish explorer of North America
- Juan Rivera (baseball) (born 1978), Venezuelan major league baseball outfielder
- Juan Rivera (born 1964), American wrestler, better known by his stage name Savio Vega
- Juan Rivera (wrongful conviction) (born 1972), American wrongfully convicted three times of a rape and murder
- Juan Rivera (singer), American singer and actor
- Juan Ríus Rivera (1848–1924), Puerto Rican soldier in the Cuban Liberation Army
- Juan Rullán Rivera (1884–?), Puerto Rican politician, mayor of Mayagüez 1921–1932
