= SS Reina del Mar =

Reina del Mar was the name of a number of ships, including the following:

- SS Reina del Mar (1951), a cruise ship originally launched as Ocean Monarch. Renamed Reina del Mar in 1981 and gutted by fire and sunk in the same year.
- SS Reina del Mar (1955), built in 1955 by Harland and Wolff for the Pacific Steam Navigation Company's service to the West Coast of South America. Later in service for the Union Castle Line. Laid up in April 1975 and scrapped later the same year.
