= Kyocera E3100 =

Kyocera Rio
- Manufacturer: Kyocera Wireless
- Compatible networks: CDMA2000
- Form factor: Slate
- Dimensions: 105×56×12.8 mm (4.13×2.20×0.50 in)
- Weight: 90 g (3 oz)
- Removable storage: Micro SD
- Battery: 920 mAh Li-ion
- Rear camera: 1.3-megapixel
- Display: 240x320 pixels
- External display: 2.8 inches
- Other: Touchscreen, Haptic Touch feedback

The Kyocera E3100, often referred to as the Kyocera Rio, is a touch slate phone from Kyocera with MP3 music player. It was announced at the 2010 CTIA show, where it was said that the launch operator would be Cricket in the USA. Movilnet launched It in the Venezuelan market. Features include:

- LCD resistive touch color display - 240 x 320 pixels - 2.8"
- Web access: WAP 2.0 Browser
- GPS Locator
- Stereo Bluetooth
- MicroSD card
- Voice activated dialing

Other technical data:

- Battery Life: Talk: up to 5.5 hours, Standby: up to 336 hours

== Carriers ==
- Cricket Wireless (discontinued)
- Mobi (discontinued)
- Movilnet (discontinued)
