= Rio (given name) =

Rio is a unisex give name which may refer to:

== Men ==
- Rio Adebisi (born 2000), English footballer
- Rio Fahmi (born 2001), Indonesian footballer
- Rio Fanning (1931–2018), Northern Irish actor
- Rio Ferdinand (born 1978), English football player
- Rio Goldhammer (born 1990), English musician and filmmaker
- Rio Gomez (born 1994), American baseball player
- Rio Hackford (1970–2022), American actor
- Rio Haryanto (born 1993), Indonesian racing driver
- Rio Hillen (born 2003), Dutch footballer
- Rio Hope-Gund (born 1999), American soccer player
- Rio Komiya (小宮 璃央; born 2002), Japanese model and actor
- Rio Mavuba (born 1984), French football player
- Rio Ngumoha (born 2008), English footballer
- Rio Nitta (二田 理央; born 2003), Japanese footballer
- Rio Noguchi (野口 莉央; born 1998), Japanese tennis player
- Rio Omori (大森 理生; born 2002), Japanese footballer
- Rio Preisner (1925–2007), Czech-born poet
- Rio Raj (born 1989), Indian actor
- Rio Ramandika (born 1989), Indonesian footballer
- Rio Ramirez (born 1998), Mexican-American soccer player
- Rio Reiser (1950–1996), German singer
- Rio Rii (born 1996), Vanuatuan rower
- Rio Ruiz (born 1994), American baseball player
- Rio Sakuma (佐久間 理央; born 1997), Japanese footballer
- Rio Saputro (born 1995), Indonesian footballer
- Rio Shipston (born 2004), English footballer
- Rio Suryana (born 1977), Indonesian-Australian badminton player
- Rio Waida (born 2000), Japanese-Indonesian surfer
- Rio Wells, Canadian football player and MMA fighter
- Rio Yañez (born 1980), American artist

== Women ==
- Rio Fredrika (born 1995), English presenter and model
- Rio Hardy (footballer) (born 1996), English footballer
- Rio Hirai (平井 理央; born 1982), Japanese TV announcer
- Rio Kanno (菅野 莉央; born 1993), Japanese actress
- Rio Kishida (岸田 理生; 1946–2003), Japanese playwright
- Rio Locsin (born 1961), Filipino actress
- Rio Matsumoto (born 1982), Japanese actress, model and singer
- Rio Natsuki (born 1969), Japanese voice actress
- Rio Natsume (夏目 理緒; born 1985), Japanese gravure idol
- Rio Sasaki (佐々木 りお; born 2002), Japanese child actress
- Rio Shimamoto (島本 理生; born 1983), Japanese writer
- Rio Shimono (下野 璃央; born 2000), Japanese racing driver
- Rio Shirai (白井 璃緒; born 1999), Japanese swimmer
- Rio Suzuki (born 2005), Japanese child actress
- Rio Takizawa (瀧澤 莉央; born 1996), Japanese footballer
- Rio Teramoto (寺本 莉緒; born 2001), Japanese Gravure idol
- Rio Uchida (内田 理央; born 1991), Japanese actress
- Rio Watari (渡利 璃穏; born 1991), Japanese wrestler
- Rio Yamase (山瀬 理桜), Japanese violinist
- Rio Yamashita (山下 リオ; born 1992), Japanese actress
