= Alice de Rivera =

American physician and women's rights activist

Alice de Rivera (born 1955 or 1956) is an American physician and women's rights activist. She is noted for her efforts towards gender integration at Stuyvesant High School, which set a "cultural precedent" for the loosening of gender restrictions at a number of other institutions.

== Background ==
De Rivera is the daughter of Margaret, an educational therapist, and Joseph, a professor of psychology. Her great-grandmother Eugenie de Rivera was a suffragist.

She excelled at school, skipping third grade and achieving a score in the 99th percentile on a New York City mathematics examination at age 13. However, her local public high school offered limited opportunities for enrichment. Stuyvesant High School, a specialized secondary school, did offer such opportunities, but was at the time boys-only; girls were not permitted to apply.

== Lawsuit ==
De Rivera and a schoolmate approached Ramona Ripston of the National Emergency Civil Liberties Committee about the possibility of taking action against Stuyvesant. At her encouragement, de Rivera requested and was denied an application for Stuyvesant, and subsequently filed suit against the Board of Education on January 20, 1969, for denying her request on the basis of her gender. Her lawyer, Eleanor Jackson Piel, drew parallels between her case and the Civil Rights Movement.

At the trial de Rivera attracted significant media attention; she was dubbed "a crusader in miniskirts", although she lamented the press emphasis on her appearance and attire. Near the end of the trial the Board of Education decided to repeal the gender restriction rather than proceed. De Rivera ultimately did not attend Stuyvesant because her family moved out of the city shortly after the trial; however, thirteen girls did enroll at the school in fall 1969 under a quota system. Despite the discrimination faced by these initial students – including verbal abuse and sexual harassment – over 200 girls enrolled the following year after the quota was removed. The decision also set off a wave of repeals of gender restrictions at other institutions, including other city high schools, preparatory schools, and universities.

== Later life ==
De Rivera ultimately received a General Educational Development (GED) rather than a conventional high-school diploma. She attended medical school at the University of Massachusetts and became a physician. During her career she "has practiced medicine at refugee camps in Kenya and with displaced earthquake victims in Haiti, at free clinics and in rural Maine, taking her straightforward, no-nonsense style and medical expertise directly to people who needed help the most". She now lives in a farmstead outside Auburn, Maine, and operates a free clinic in Lewiston. In 2013 she was awarded an honorary Stuyvesant diploma.
