= Tin Pot Operation =

Indie-punk band from Belfast

- Also known as: TPO
- Origin: Belfast, Northern Ireland
- Genres: Indie rock, punk rock
- Years active: 2004–present
- Label: 0% Records
- Members: Anto O'Kane; Ray Lawlor; Shaz Morgan; Brian Steenson; Dáithí McGibbon
- Past members: Marty Malone (The Vals); Máirtín Mag Uidhir (drums)
- Website: TinPotOperation.com

Tin Pot Operation or TPO are an indie-punk band originally from Belfast, Northern Ireland, where they have a large local following.

They are known for the political content of their music with songs about racism, media manipulation and war. The band have also played support to The Stranglers, aslan and Duke Special and, most recently, were picked by The Damned to play as part of their Twisted Cabaret show in Belfast.

They have released a fourteen track album entitled Manufacturing Dissent (2005) and a six-track EP called Here! It's the Tin Pot Operation., along with a stand-alone single "Blackeye" in December 2006.

The band were featured as part of a documentary on the music of Northern Ireland following The Troubles They are noted as being one of the few non-traditional bands to actively write and perform in the Irish Language. They have appeared live on BBC 2 Northern Ireland's Irish Language music show, An Stuif Ceart, and reached the final of the Irish Language band competition, "Deis Roc", judged by Horslips member Jim Lockhart. They appeared alongside Foy Vance, David Holmes and Ocean Colour Scene at the 2008 New Year's Eve celebrations in Belfast.

The political content of their music has also seen them listed at The Centre for Political Song at Glasgow Caledonian University.

The band have released Human Resources on the band's own record label Nought Percent Records (a play on the fact that it was funded with a "0% for 6 months" credit card deal). The first single from the new album was "Sitting There", which was released as a free download. The album was initially released in download only form in March 2009.

== Releases ==
- Manufacturing Dissent - album (2005)
- Here! It's the Tin Pot Operation - EP (2006)
- "Blackeye" - single (2006)
- "Sitting There" - single (2008)
- Human Resources - album (2009)
