= TVRío =

TVRío (CXB 32)
Paysandú, Paysandú Department; Uruguay
- Channels: Analog: 3 (VHF); Digital: 31 (UHF); Virtual: 3.1

Programming
- Affiliations: La Red

Ownership
- Owner: Universo Multimedios

History
- First air date: 19 June 1968

Technical information
- Licensing authority: URSEC

TVRío is a Uruguayan free-to-air television station, located in the city of Paysandú, capital of the department of the same name, founded in 1968. The station is owned by Universo Multimedios, who also owns Radio Paysandú, Éxito FM and newspaper Somos de Acá. The station is a La Red affiliate.

== History ==
The station was established in 1968 and was branded in its early years as Canal 3 Río de los Pájaros. Usually the station would open at 6:30pm, but there were occasions where the station opened earlier to provide live coverage of special events.

TVRío relocated to new premises on 19 June 2025, the date of its 57th anniversary. Its playout is entirely in high definition, while the station's relay network had reportedly switched off its analog signals since 2024. The relocation also brought together the group's four outlets under one roof, creating corporate synergy.
