= Riviera, Ticino =

Riviera
- Municipality
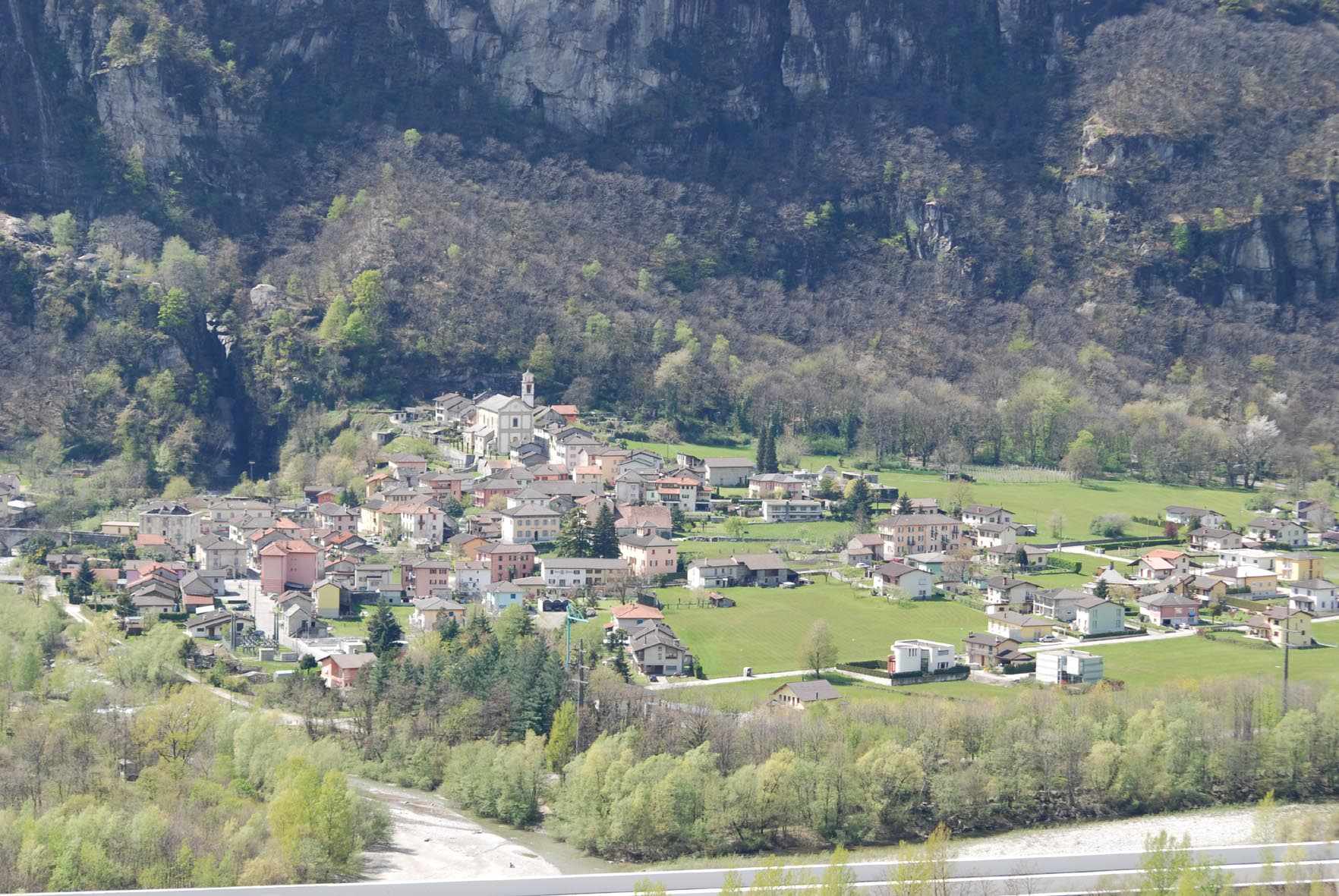
- Lodrino village

- Flag Coat of arms
- Location of Riviera
- Location within Switzerland Location within Canton of Ticino
- Coordinates: 46°19′N 8°59′E
- Country: Switzerland
- Canton: Ticino
- District: Riviera

Government
  - Executive: Municipio with 7 members
  - Mayor: Sindaco; Alberto Pellanda FDP.The Liberals (as of June 2019)
  - Parliament: Consiglio comunale with 31 members

Area
  - Total: 86.17 km^{2} (33.27 sq mi)
- Elevation: 274 m (899 ft)

Population (December 2004)
  - Total: 4,001
  - Density: 46.43/km^{2} (120.3/sq mi)
- Time zone: UTC+01:00 (CET)
  - Summer (DST): UTC+02:00 (CEST)
- Postal code: 6527, 6703, 6705, 6707
- SFOS number: 5287
- ISO 3166 code: CH-TI
- Surrounded by: Personico, Biasca, Arvigo, Cauco, San Vittore, Claro, Moleno, Lavertezzo
- Website: comuneriviera.ch

Riviera (Italian pronunciation: [riˈvjɛːra]) is a new municipality in the district of Riviera in the canton of Ticino in Switzerland. The municipalities of Osogna, Lodrino, Iragna and Cresciano merged on April 2, 2017.

== History ==
On October 18, 2015 the citizens of Osogna, Lodrino, Iragna and Cresciano voted to merge their municipalities into the new municipality of Riviera as the name of their district. The merger was enacted by the Grand Council of Ticino. The election of the municipal council marked the beginning of the new municipality.

== Geography ==
The municipality is located in the Riviera district south of Biasca and north of Bellinzona on both banks of the Ticino. A recreation park is planned on these banks.

The rocks of the region consist mainly of gneisses and granites (some quarries are operated in Lodrino). The vegetation is composed primarily of deciduous trees (beeches, chestnut trees) up to about 900 m (3,000 ft) and then evergreen trees (spruces and larches). Chestnuts were an important food for the population.

== Demographics ==
The new municipality has a population (as of December 2020) of 4,252.

== Historic population ==
The historical population is given in the following chart:
