= Victoria Transit Patrol =

- Abbreviation: TPD
- Motto: To provide a safe, orderly environment within the Public Transit Network in order to promote the confidence of the public and to enhance the maximum use of the network.

Agency overview
- Formed: 1878
- Dissolved: 1992

Jurisdictional structure
- Operations jurisdiction: Victoria, Australia
- Specialist jurisdiction: Railways, tramways, rail transit systems

Operational structure
- Agency executives: Tom Gillett (1990-1992), Chief Superintendent Victoria Police; Graham Davidson (1989-1990), Chief Superintendent Victoria Police; Bob (Robert) Davis (1987-1989), Chief Superintendent
- Parent agency: Public Transport Corporation
- Units: List: Armoured Vehicle Unit; Community Relations Unit; Crime Investigation Unit; Internal Investigations Unit; Melbourne Freight Terminal Patrol Unit; Motorcycle Unit; Over Dimensional Load Unit; Parking Unit; Prosecutions Unit; Revenue Protection Unit; Special Operations Group; Training Unit; Transport Unit; Uniform Section
- Regions: Central, Eastern, Southern, Bendigo, Ballarat, Geelong, Mildura, Morwell, Wodonga

Website
- riotpo.com

Victoria Transit Patrol Department, also formerly known as Victorian Railways Investigation Division, was a state government law enforcement agency that was in charge of responding to and investigating crimes that took place on railway property throughout Victoria, Australia. Personnel were formally called Railway Investigation Officers but their title changed in 1987 when the role of patrolling Government Trams and Buses came within their responsibility, renaming the division to Victoria Transit Patrol. The Victoria Transit Patrol Department was officially disbanded in 1992 giving total Transit Law Enforcement responsibilities to the Victoria Police.

== History ==
The Victoria Transit Patrol was formed in 1878 after the Victoria Railway Commissioner determined that there was a need for a detective to investigate crimes, missing luggage and freight, and accidents that took place on the railway system. They were expanded in 1890 with the introduction of officers who made random checks at railway stations to arrest those who evaded fares. These officers were initially referred to as “Flying Gangs” but were later called Ticket Examiners.

In 1899, the name used for detectives of the organization changed to Special Inquiry Officers and they became their own branch within what was then, the Victorian Railways. Another name change came in 1947 when the Special Inquiry Branch was renamed the Railway Investigation Division and the officers were referred to as Railway Investigation Officers. The Transit Patrol has had numerous other divisions including the Armored Vehicle Division that was used to transport payrolls and station revenue.

In 1986, Transit Patrol took over the policing of trams and buses in addition to their railway duties. It was approximately one year later when the department became managed by the Victoria Police while still coming under the Metropolitan / State Transport Authority's umbrella at which time it was renamed the Transit Patrol. In 1992, the Transit Patrol became defunct and ceased to exist.

== Sidearms and Equipment ==
Standard firearm issue was the Ruger Police Service-Six stainless steel, 6 shot .357 magnum with standard issue ammunition being 125 grain JHP 38+P.

When working undercover, officers had the choice of the Ruger Police Service-Six or the Smith & Wesson "Chief's Special" stainless steel 5 shot in .38 calibre. Officers were free to use their own equipment belt and accessories or the departmental equipment belts with gun holster manufactured by "Helweg" of Melbourne.

Officers were issued a 26 Inch polycarbonate nightstick with belt ring, standard issue departmental handcuffs were the "Saf Lok" mark 4 issue with double cylinder lock making them virtually pick proof along with Motorola 2 way portable radio with or without extension mouthpiece.

Other departmental issue equipment was a 1P key to enable officers to raise and lock boom gates at faulty level crossings to enable traffic to pass but only at the direction of the officer. An "H" key was also issued to enable officers to travel between carriages through the communication door to apprehend offenders and to close Railway Stations to the general public in case of emergencies.

== Rank structure ==
Victoria Transit Patrol Ranks
Rank	Transit; Patrol; Officer	Senior; TPO	Sergeant; TPO	Inspector; TPO	Chief; Inspector; TPO	Superintendent; TPO	Manager; TPD
Insignia							

== Gallery ==
Victoria Transit Patrol Throughout History
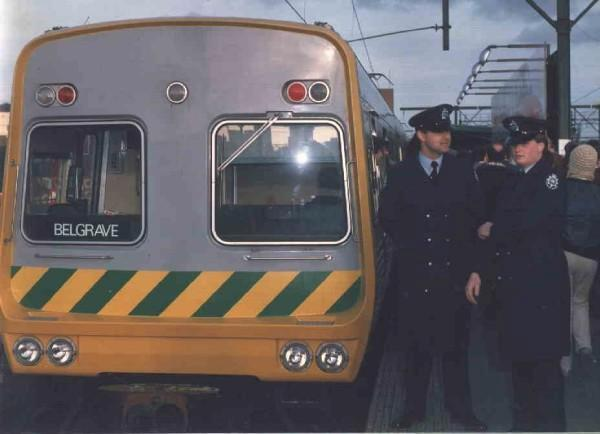
Railway Investigation Officers Prior to Their Name Change to Transit Patrol Officers.

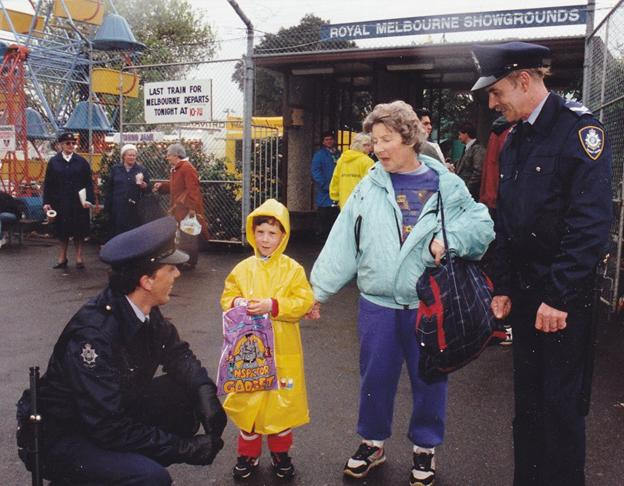
Transit Patrol Officers after their name change Circa 1991 (note new and old shoulder patches).

== See also ==
- Law enforcement in Australia
- Victorian Railways
- Public Transport Corporation
