= Rio =

Rio or Río is the Portuguese and Spanish word for "river". The word also exists in Italian, but is largely obsolete and used in a poetical or literary context to mean "stream".

Rio, RIO or Río may also refer to:

== Arts and entertainment ==
=== Films ===
- Rio (1939 film), starring Basil Rathbone
- Rio (franchise), a film series and related media
  - Rio (2011 film), an animated film from 20th Century Fox and Blue Sky Studios
  - Rio (soundtrack)
  - Rio 2, the 2014 sequel

=== Literature ===
- Research Ideas and Outcomes, an open-access journal
- A Lake District town in Swallows and Amazons, an English children's novel

=== Music ===
==== Albums ====
- Río (Aterciopelados album), 2008
- Rio (Uri Caine album), 2001
- Rio (Duran Duran album), 1982
- Rio (Keith Jarrett album), 2011
- Rio (Joyce album), 2012
- Rio (Trevor Rabin album), 2023
- Rio (Lee Ritenour album), 1979

==== Songs ====
- "Rio" (Duran Duran song), 1982
- "Rio" (Ledri Vula song), 2019
- "Rio", by Hey Marseilles from the 2008 album To Travels & Trunks
- "Rio" (Michael Nesmith song), 1977
- "Rio", by Wavelength from the 1982 album Hurry Home

==== Other uses in music ====
- R.I.O., a German dance band
- RIO (English band), an English rock duo
- Rock in Opposition, or RIO, a musical movement in the 1970s

=== Television and anime ===
- "Rio" (CSI: Miami), the first episode in Season 5 (September 2006) of the American television program CSI: Miami
- TVRío, a television station in Paysandú, Uruguay
- TV Rio, a defunct television station in Rio de Janeiro, Brazil
- Rio: Rainbow Gate!, a 2011 anime series based on a pachinko franchise by Tecmo

=== Video games ===
- Rio (video game), the 2011 tie-in game for Nintendo DS, Wii, PS3, and Xbox 360
- Angry Birds Rio, an edition of the game Angry Birds tying into the release of Rio

== Businesses and products ==
- Rio All Suite Hotel and Casino, a resort in Las Vegas, US
- RIO Washingtonian Center, also stylized as "rio", a shopping center in Gaithersburg, Maryland, US
- Rio (British drink), a British soft drink brand
- Rio (Chinese drink), a Chinese alcopop brand
- RIO Models, diecast miniature cars made in Italy

== Other organizations ==
- Rio Group, founded 1986, an international organization of Latin American states
- Regional Institute of Ophthalmology, several institutes in India
- Regulatory Innovation Office (RIO)
- Revolutionary Internationalist Organisation (RIO), political party in Germany

== People ==
- Rio (given name)
- Rio (surname)
- Tina Yuzuki (born 1986), also known as Rio, Japanese AV idol

== Places ==
=== United States ===
- Rio, Florida, a census-designated place
- Rio, Georgia, an unincorporated community
- Rio, Illinois, a village
- Rio, a location in Deerpark, New York
- Rio, Virginia, a community
- Rio, West Virginia, a village
- Rio, Wisconsin, a village
- El Río, Las Piedras, Puerto Rico, a barrio

=== Elsewhere ===
- Rio de Janeiro, Brazil, often referred to as simply Rio
- Rio, Italy, a municipality on the island of Elba in Tuscany
- Rio, Greece, a community in suburban Patras

== Roles and professions ==
- Radar Intercept Officer, or RIO
- Railway Investigation Officer, or RIO, a rank in the Victoria Transit Patrol
- Remote interface officer (RIO) Flight Controller, integrates communications between Mission Control Center Houston and other space centers

== Technology ==
- Rio (digital audio players), a brand name of a line of digital audio players
- Rio (windowing system), the windowing system for the Plan 9 from Bell Labs operating system
- Kyocera Rio, or Kyocera E3100, a mobile phone
- Reconfigurable Input/Output, or RIO, found in devices such as the CompactRIO
- Winsock RIO extensions, part of the Winsock network API

== Transportation ==
- Avian Rio, a British hang glider
- RIO, the IATA airport code for all airports near Rio de Janeiro
- Kia Rio, a 1999–present Korean subcompact car
- Panther Rio, a 1975–1977 British full-size sedan
- Premier Rio, a 2009–2018 Indian subcompact SUV

== See also ==
- Del Rio (disambiguation)
- Regional Health Information Organization (RHIO)
- Ríos (disambiguation)
