= Del Rio =

Del Rio or del Río, del Rios is a Spanish term meaning "of / from the river", and may refer to:

== Places in the United States ==
- Del Rio, California
- Del Rio, Florida
- Del Rio, Tennessee
- Del Rio, Texas

== People ==
- Alberto Del Rio (born 1977; real name Alberto Rodríguez), Mexican professional wrestler who also performed under the name Dos Caras, Jr.
- Andrés Manuel del Río (1764–1849), scientist and naturalist who discovered the chemical element vanadium
- Antonio del Río (1745–1789), was a captain who led the first excavation of the Maya ruins
- Bianca Del Rio (born 1975), American drag queen
- Carlos Alberto Arroyo del Río, Ecuadorean President
- Dolores del Río (1904–1983), Mexican actress
- Gabriel del Río (born 1976), Argentine-born Spanish chess grandmaster
- Harry Del Rios (born 1973), American pro-wrestler
- Jack Del Rio (born 1963), American football player and coach
- Lázaro Cárdenas del Río (1895–1970), a Mexican army officer and politician who served as President of Mexico from 1934 to 1940
- Luke Del Rio (born 1994), American football player and coach, son of Jack
- Paloma del Río (born 1960), Spanish journalist
- Paul del Rio (1943-2015), Venezuelan revolutionary, sculptor and painter
- Paula del Río (born 2000), is a Spanish film and television actress
- Pío del Río Hortega (1882–1945), was a neuroscientist who discovered microglia.
- Rebekah Del Rio (1967–2025), American singer-songwriter and actress
- Yolanda del Rio (born 1955), Mexican singer
- Graziano Delrio (born 1960), Italian medical doctor and politician

== See also ==
- Riario an Italian noble family
- Martínez del Río, family
- Los del Río, Latin pop band
- Ford Del Rio, an American station wagon
- Rio (disambiguation)
- Ríos (disambiguation)
