= Riviera District =

Coordinates: 46°21′N 8°59′E

Riviera District Distretto di Riviera
- District
- Country: Switzerland
- Canton: Ticino
- Capital: Riviera

Area
  - Total: 145.2 km^{2} (56.1 sq mi)

Population (2020)
  - Total: 10,346
  - Density: 71.25/km^{2} (184.5/sq mi)
- Time zone: UTC+1 (CET)
  - Summer (DST): UTC+2 (CEST)
- Municipalities: 2

The Riviera District is a district of the canton of Ticino in Switzerland. It has a population of 10,346 (as of 31 December 2020). The capital of the district is Riviera.

== Geography ==
The Riviera District has an area, as of 1997, of 166.49 square kilometers (64.28 sq mi). Of this area, 9.77 km^{2} (3.77 sq mi) or 5.9% is used for agricultural purposes, while 97.23 km^{2} (37.54 sq mi) or 58.4% is forested. Of the rest of the land, 7.41 km^{2} (2.86 sq mi) or 4.5% is settled (buildings or roads), 2.9 km^{2} (1.1 sq mi) or 1.7% is either rivers or lakes and 43.19 km^{2} (16.68 sq mi) or 25.9% is unproductive land.

Of the built up area, housing and buildings made up 1.7% and transportation infrastructure made up 1.4%. Out of the forested land, 48.1% of the total land area is heavily forested and 2.6% is covered with orchards or small clusters of trees. Of the agricultural land, 3.7% is used for growing crops and 1.7% is used for alpine pastures. All the water in the district is flowing water. Of the unproductive areas, 11.5% is unproductive vegetation and 14.4% is too rocky for vegetation.

== Demographics ==
Of the Swiss national languages (as of 2000), 343 speak German, 97 people speak French, 9,978 people speak Italian, and 12 people speak Romansh. The remainder (1,004 people) speak another language.

As of 2008, the gender distribution of the population was 50.0% male and 50.0% female. The population was made up of 4,151 Swiss men (33.5% of the population), and 2,055 (16.6%) non-Swiss men. There were 4,566 Swiss women (36.8%), and 1,628 (13.1%) non-Swiss women.

In 2008 there were 69 live births to Swiss citizens and 37 births to non-Swiss citizens, and in same time span there were 84 deaths of Swiss citizens and 18 non-Swiss citizen deaths. Ignoring immigration and emigration, the population of Swiss citizens decreased by 15 while the foreign population increased by 19. There were 3 Swiss men and 7 Swiss women who immigrated back to Switzerland. At the same time, there were 57 non-Swiss men and 32 non-Swiss women who immigrated from another country to Switzerland. The total Swiss population change in 2008 (from all sources) was an increase of 113 and the non-Swiss population change was a decrease of 24 people. This represents a population growth rate of 0.7%.

The age distribution, as of 2009, in the Riviera District is: 1,243 children or 10.0% of the population are between 0 and 9 years old and 1,388 teenagers or 11.2% are between 10 and 19. Of the adult population, 1,400 people or 11.3% of the population are between 20 and 29 years old. 1,697 people or 13.7% are between 30 and 39, 2,104 people or 17.0% are between 40 and 49, and 1,592 people or 12.8% are between 50 and 59. The senior population distribution is 1,405 people or 11.3% of the population are between 60 and 69 years old, 1,006 people or 8.1% are between 70 and 79, there are 565 people or 4.6% who are over 80.

In 2000 there were 4,987 single family homes (or 55.0% of the total) out of a total of 9,061 inhabited buildings. There were 1,308 two family buildings (14.4%) and 2,240 multi-family buildings (24.7%). There were also 526 buildings in the district that were multipurpose buildings (used for both housing and commercial or another purpose).

In 2000 there were 5,661 apartments in the district. The most common apartment size was the 4 room apartment of which there were 2,025. There were 268 single room apartments and 1,187 apartments with five or more rooms. Of these apartments, a total of 4,494 apartments (79.4% of the total) were permanently occupied, while 958 apartments (16.9%) were seasonally occupied and 209 apartments (3.7%) were empty.

The historical population is given in the following table:

year	population
1850	4,449
1880	4,884
1900	6,024
1950	5,816
1980	9,579
1990	10,267
2000	11,434

== Politics ==
In the 2007 federal election the most popular party was the FDP which received 29.75% of the vote. The next three most popular parties were the CVP (25.08%), the SP (19.5%) and the Ticino League (15.71%). In the federal election, a total of 3,264 votes were cast, and the voter turnout was 48.0%.

In the 2007 Ticino Gran Consiglio election, there were a total of 6,836 registered voters in the Riviera District, of which 4,550 or 66.6% voted. 74 blank ballots and 11 null ballots were cast, leaving 4,465 valid ballots in the election. The most popular party was the PLRT which received 1,017 or 22.8% of the vote. The next three most popular parties were; the PPD+GenGiova (with 829 or 18.6%), the SSI (with 815 or 18.3%) and the PS (with 814 or 18.2%).

In the 2007 Ticino Consiglio di Stato election, 40 blank ballots and 8 null ballots were cast, leaving 4,503 valid ballots in the election. The most popular party was the PLRT which received 984 or 21.9% of the vote. The next three most popular parties were; the PS (with 959 or 21.3%), the LEGA (with 930 or 20.7%) and the PPD (with 841 or 18.7%).

== Religion ==
From the 2000 census, 8,858 or 77.5% were Roman Catholic, while 391 or 3.4% belonged to the Swiss Reformed Church. There are 1,769 individuals (or about 15.47% of the population) who belong to another church (not listed on the census), and 416 individuals (or about 3.64% of the population) did not answer the question.

== Education ==
In the Riviera District there was a total of 2,199 students (as of 2009). The Ticino education system provides up to three years of non-mandatory kindergarten and in the Riviera District there were 332 children in kindergarten. The primary school program lasts for five years and includes both a standard school and a special school. In the district, 649 students attended the standard primary schools and 25 students attended the special school. In the lower secondary school system, students either attend a two-year middle school followed by a two-year pre-apprenticeship or they attend a four-year program to prepare for higher education. There were 576 students in the two-year middle school and 7 in their pre-apprenticeship, while 213 students were in the four-year advanced program.

The upper secondary school includes several options, but at the end of the upper secondary program, a student will be prepared to enter a trade or to continue on to a university or college. In Ticino, vocational students may either attend school while working on their internship or apprenticeship (which takes three or four years) or may attend school followed by an internship or apprenticeship (which takes one year as a full-time student or one and a half to two years as a part-time student). There were 121 vocational students who were attending school full-time and 241 who attend part-time.

The professional program lasts three years and prepares a student for a job in engineering, nursing, computer science, business, tourism and similar fields. There were 35 students in the professional program.

== Circles and municipalities ==
Circle of Riviera
Coat of arms	Municipality	Population (31 December 2020)	Area km^{2}
Biasca	Biasca	6,094	59.13
Riviera	Riviera	4096	86.07
	Total	10264	21.81
