= River (disambiguation) =

A river is a flowing body of water.

River may also refer to:

== Places ==
- River, Indiana, former name of San Pierre, US
- River, Kent, a village and civil parish in Kent, England
- River, West Sussex, a hamlet in England
- River Township, Red Lake County, Minnesota, US

== People ==
- Dylan River, Australian filmmaker
- Jack River (musician) (born Holly Rankin, 1991), Australian singer-songwriter
- Neea River, Finnish musician
- River Cracraft (born 1994), American football player
- River Jones (born 1977), American musician
- River Phoenix (1970–1993), American actor

== Arts, entertainment, and media ==
=== Films and television ===
- River (2007 film), a Canadian film by Mark Wihak
- River (2011 film), a Japanese film
- River (2015 Canadian film), a Canadian film by Jamie M. Dagg
- River (2015 Tibetan film), a Tibetan film
- River (2021 film), an Australian film by Jennifer Peedom
- River (2023 film), a Japanese film starring Yoshimasa Kondo
- River (2026 film), an American horror film
- River (TV series), a British television series released in 2015

=== Music ===
==== Albums ====
- River (Izzy Stradlin album), 2001
- River (Terry Reid album)
- River: The Joni Letters, a 2007 album by Herbie Hancock
- River, a Japanese-language album by Hound Dog
- River (EP), an EP by Coby Sey

==== Songs ====
- "River" (Joni Mitchell song), 1971, covered by multiple artists
- "River" (Dragon song), 1988
- "River" (AKB48 song), 2009
- "River" (Bishop Briggs song), 2016
- "River" (Eminem song), 2017
- "River" (Krystian Ochman song), 2022
- "River" (Pnau and Ladyhawke song), 2020
- "River" (Miley Cyrus song), 2023
- "River" (¥$ and Young Thug song), 2024
- "River", by Gentle Giant from Octopus
- "River", by Badger from One Live Badger
- "River", by Enya from Watermark
- "River", by Lights from The Listening
- "River", by Grimes from Halfaxa
- "River", by Emeli Sandé from Our Version of Events
- "River", by Ibeyi from Ibeyi
- "River", by Leon Bridges from Coming Home
- "River", by Akron/Family from Set 'Em Wild, Set 'Em Free
- "River", by Sault from 11
- "River", by Labi Siffre from his self-titled debut album
- "River", by King Trigger
- "River", by Tom Gregory
- "River", by Take That, from their 2017 album Wonderland

== Games ==
- River (poker), a nickname for the final card dealt in certain variations of poker

=== Sports ===
- River, nickname of the football team of Club Atlético River Plate, Argentina
- LJ Volley, an Italian women's volleyball club based in Modena 2013-2016
- River Volley, an Italian women's volleyball club based in Piacenza

== Other uses ==
- River (typography), unattractive gaps appearing to run down a paragraph of text
- Kimfly River, a Slovenian paraglider design
- river, the Android codename of the Motorola Moto G7 smartphone
- River class, warships classes named river

== See also ==
- River (given name)
- Rio (disambiguation)
- Ríos (disambiguation)
- Rive (disambiguation)
- Rivers (disambiguation)
- Rivier (disambiguation)
- Rivière (disambiguation)
- The River (disambiguation)
- List of river films and television series
- List of rivers
