= Rivier =

Rivier can mean:

- Wadi, dry riverbed, called rivier in southwest Africa
- Rivier University, American liberal arts college

== Surname ==
- Anne-Marie Rivier (1768–1838), French nun
- Hélène Rivier (1902–1986), Swiss librarian
- Jean Rivier (1896–1987), French composer
- Silvio Rivier, Croatian–Australian television presenter
- William Rivier, 20th-century Swiss chess master

== See also ==
- River (disambiguation)
- Rivière (disambiguation)
