= Rive =

Rive or La Rive may refer to:

== Places ==
- Rive, Piedmont, Italy
- Rive d'Arcano, Friuli-Venezia Giulia, Italy
- Rive Droite, Paris, France
- Rive Gauche, Paris, France

== People ==
- De la Rive, a surname and list of people
- Joey Rive (July 8, 1963) American tennis player
- Julie Rivé-King (1854-1937), American musician
- Lyndon Rive, cofounder of Solar City and cousin of Elon Musk
- Richard Rive (1931-1989), South African academic and writer
- Robert Rive, 19th century photographer

== Other ==
- La Rive, a restaurant in Amsterdam, Netherlands
- La Rive Condominiums, Minneapolis, Minnesota, US
- Rive (video game), a 2016 platforming shoot-em-up video game
- Wood splitting, or riving

== See also ==
- Longue-Rive, Quebec, Canada
- Belle Rive (disambiguation)
- Rives (disambiguation)
- Rivière (disambiguation)
- Ríos (disambiguation)
- Rio (disambiguation)
- Rivers (disambiguation)
- River (disambiguation)
