= Ospedale di San Paolo =

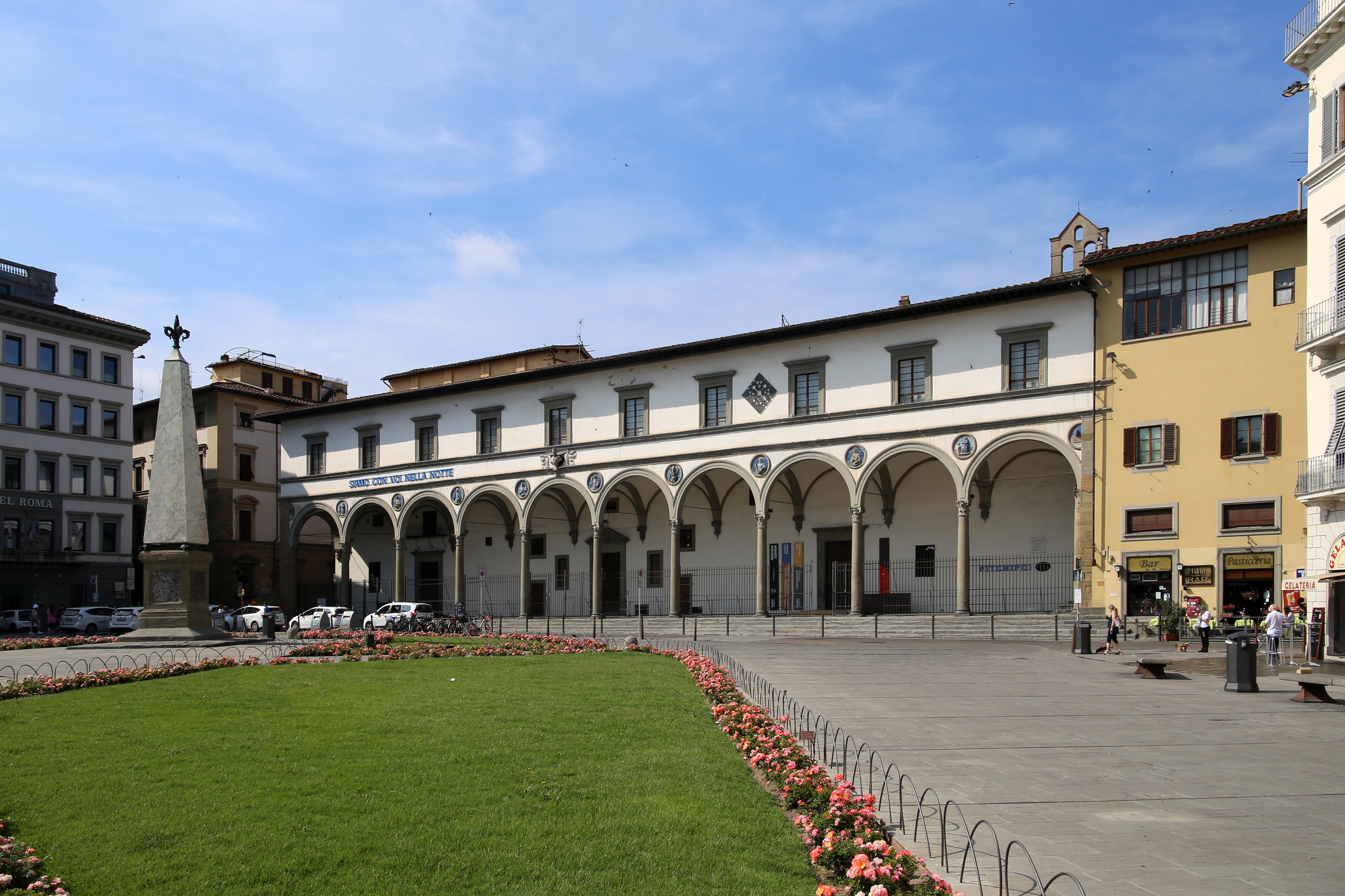

Geography
- Location: Piazza Santa Maria Novella number 10, Florence, Tuscany, Italy
- Coordinates: 43°46′22.52″N 11°14′56.82″E

History
- Opened: 1211–1222
- Closed: 1780

Links
- Lists: Hospitals in Italy

The Hospital of San Paolo (originally Ospedale di San Paolo dei Convalescenti), later known as the Spedale of the Leopoldine, is a former hospital from the 13th century, now museum of modern works, located on Piazza Santa Maria Novella number 10, in Florence, region of Tuscany, Italy.

== Past History ==
The hospital is thought by some to date to 1211-1222, when St Francis visited the city. At this time, the hospital was called Ospedale di San Francesco and it was run by lay-members of Franciscan order, called pinzocheri. The hospital had an abundance of patronage, and commissioned in 1403 a design (circa 1459) by Michelozzo. In 1504, the hospital of Santi Jacopo e Filippo, known as del Porcellana was merged with the San Paolo. In 1780, by order of the Grand Duke Peter Leopold II, its functions were transferred to the hospital of Santa Maria Nuova; the building was converted to a school for girls (Scuola Leopoldina).

Of the original structures, the long dormitory hall, the Corsia is accessed by Via Palazzuolo. The Loggia (1489–1496) facing the piazza is supported by Corinthian columns, and was influenced by Brunelleschi's Loggia for the Foundling Hospital at Piazza Santissima Annunziata. In the spandrels are tondos of Franciscan saints by Andrea della Robbia. In the center is a bust of Ferdinando I de'Medici (circa 1594) by Pietro Francavilla. The portal to the church has a Della Robbia terracotta lunette of the Encounter of Sts Francis and Dominic

In 1789, Giuseppe Salvetti replaced the dilapidated columns of the portico with new ones.

== Museo Nazionale Alinari della Fotografia (MNAF) ==
See entry at Museo Nazionale Alinari della Fotografia

Sinnce November 2006 the building houses the Alinari National Museum of Photography, accessed at Piazza Santa Maria Novella number 14. The restructuring of the space, owned by the city, was financed by the Ente Cassa di Risparmio di Firenze.

The collection's nucleus is constituted by the property of Fratelli Alinari. The museum holds a permanent exhibition about the art and science of photography, including interactive exhibits for school-age children, and also presents temporary shows.

== Museo Novecento ==
As of 2014, the communal Museo Novecento can be accessed from Piazza Santa Maria Novella number 10. It is dedicated to the Italian art of the 20th century. It consists of exhibition halls, study rooms, and a room for conferences and a cinema.
