= Rivers (surname) =

Rivers is the surname of England origin, specifically the name came to England with the House of Normandy in Battle of Hastings. The surname was very common throughout England in the Middle Ages:

== A ==
- Austin Rivers (born 1992), American basketball player; son of Doc Rivers

== B ==
- Bob Rivers (1956–2025), American rock-and-roll radio personality and producer and songwriter of parody songs
- Bobby Glen Rivers (born 1967), Recording artist and founder of The Rockin’ Psalms music project.

== C ==
- Chandler Rivers (born 2003), American football player
- Chauncey Rivers (born 1997), American football player
- Clarence Rivers (1931–2004), African-American Catholic priest and composer of liturgical music

== D ==
- Daniel Rivers (born 1991), British sport shooter
- David Rivers (born 1965), American basketball player
- David Rivers (American football) (born 1994)
- Derek Rivers (born 1994), American football player
- Diana Rivers (born 1931), American writer, artist, and activist
- Dick Rivers (1945–2019), French singer
- Glenn "Doc" Rivers (born 1961), American basketball player and coach

== E ==
- Eric Rivers, American football player

== F ==
- Francine Rivers (born 1947), American author

== G ==
- Gregory Charles Rivers (1965–2024), Australian-born Hong Kong actor

== J ==
- Jalen Rivers (born 2002), American football player
- Joan Rivers (1933–2014), American comedian and talk show host
- Joe Murray Rivers (1939–2017), American businessman
- John Rivers (died 1584), Lord Mayor of London and businessman
- John Rivers (pirate) (died 1719), based in Madagascar
- Johnny Rivers (born 1942), American singer and songwriter

== K ==
- Keith Rivers (born 1986), American football player

== L ==
- L. Mendel Rivers (1905–1970), American politician
- Larry Rivers (1923–2002), American artist
- Larry Rivers (basketball) (1949–2023), American basketball player, coach and Harlem Globetrotter

== M ==
- Mary-Jane Rivers (born 1951), New Zealand community development leader
- Melissa Rivers (born 1968), American television personality; daughter of Joan Rivers

== P ==
- Philip Rivers (born 1981), American football player

== R ==
- Ralph Julian Rivers (1903–1976), American lawyer and politician, first United States Representative from Alaska
- Richard Godfrey Rivers (1858–1925), known as R. Godfrey Rivers, English artist in Australia
- Ron Rivers (born 1971), American football player
- Ronnie Rivers (born 1999), American football player
- Ruben Rivers (1921–1944), Medal of Honor recipient

== S ==
- Sam Rivers (jazz musician) (1923–2011), American jazz musician
- Sam Rivers (bassist) (1977–2025), American bassist
- Samuel Rivers Jr. (born 1970), American politician
- Samy Rivers (born 1998), Mexican internet celebrity, YouTuber and streamer
- Saniya Rivers (born 2003), American basketball player
- Spencer Rivers, American basketball coach

== T ==
- Thomas Rivers (nurseryman) (1831–1899), British nurseryman who developed new varieties of roses and fruits
- Tina Rivers Ryan, American curator, art historian

== W ==
- W. H. R. Rivers (1864–1922), British anthropologist, neurologist and psychiatrist

== Fictional characters ==
- Clear Rivers, a character in the Final Destination franchise.
- Noah "Hardstep" Rivers, a character from the 1985 American drama television series Hell Town

== See also ==
- Ríos (disambiguation)
- Senator Rivers (disambiguation)
