= Giorgio Roster =

Italian scientist and photographer

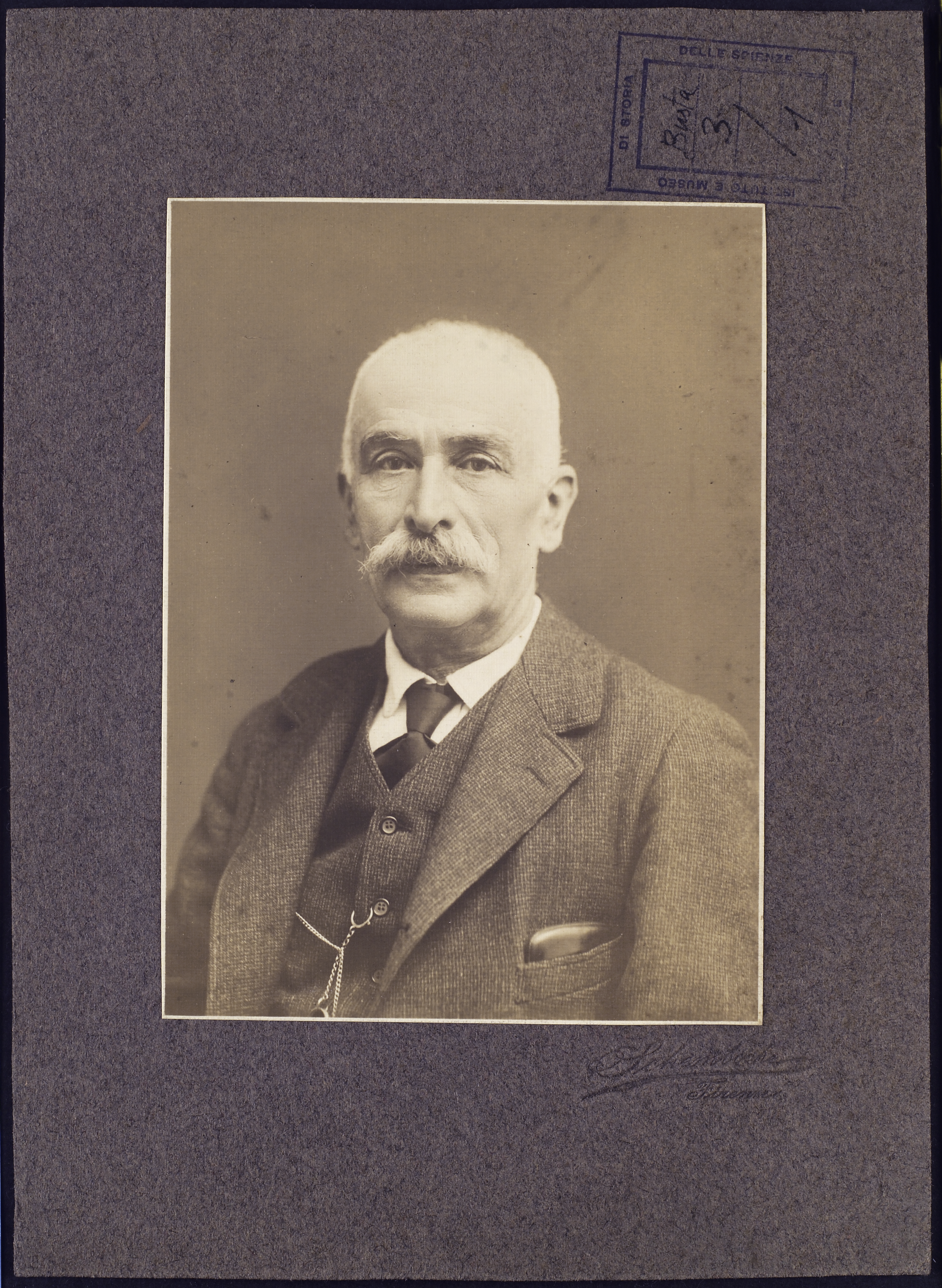
- Giorgio Roster (1843–1927)
- Born: May 20, 1843; Florence, Italy
- Died: January 17, 1927 (aged 83); Florence, Italy
- Education: University of Pisa
- Occupations: Scientist, photographer

Giorgio Roster (May 20, 1843 – January 17, 1927) was an Italian scientist and photographer.

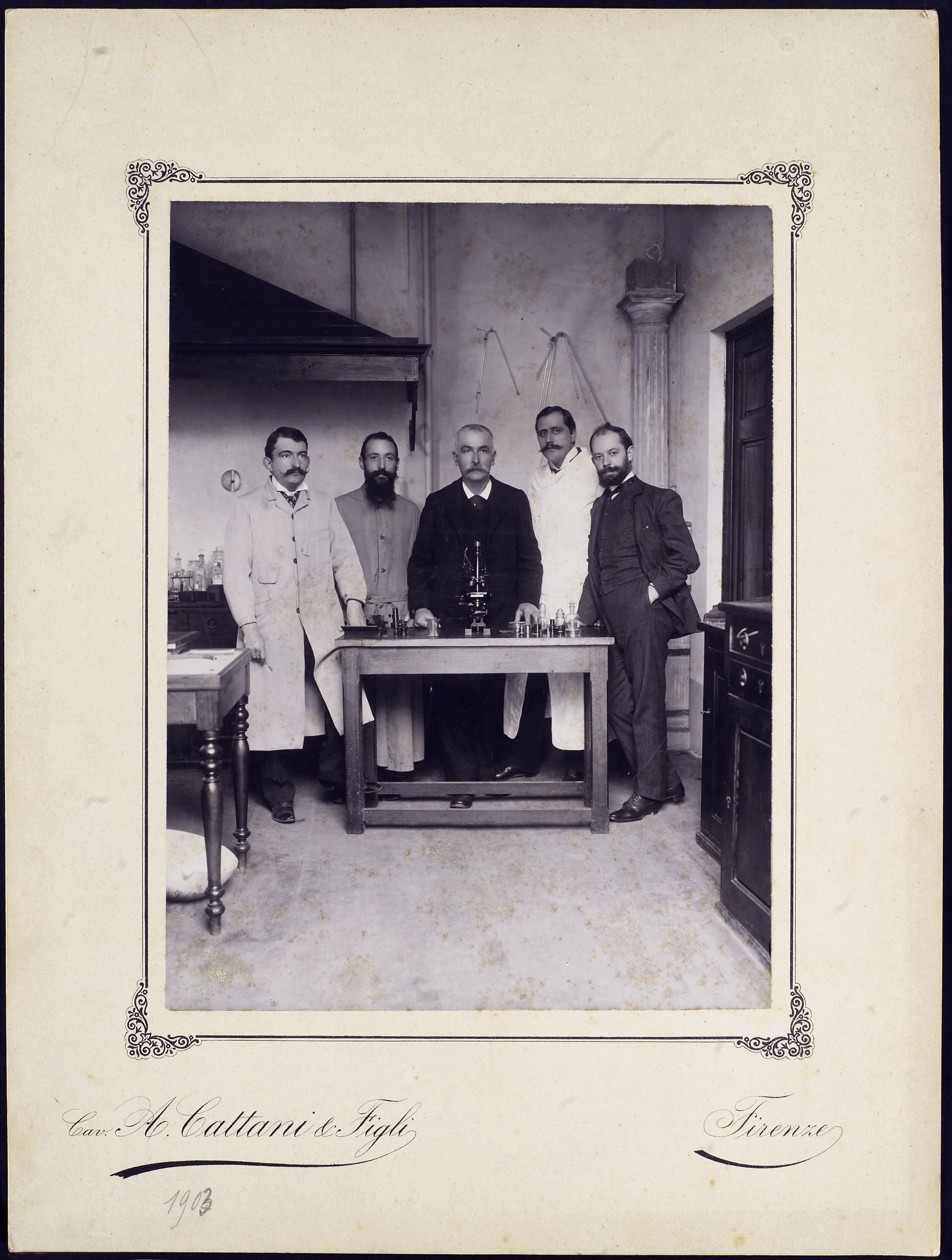
Giorgio Roster with his collaborators

== Biography ==
Giorgio Roster was born on May 20, 1843 in Florence, Italy. He studied medicine and surgery at the University of Pisa, where he graduated in 1864, and then worked as an assistant to Serafino Capezzuoli at the Institute of Physio-Pathological Chemistry of the Institute of Higher Studies in Florence.

Roster's studies on chemistry and hygiene led him abroad for extended periods, especially to German-speaking countries, where he could deepen his knowledge: in Zürich under the guidance of Johannes Wislicenus, in Strasbourg with Felix Hoppe Seyler, and in Munich with Max Joseph von Pettenkofer.

Appointed as a professor of hygiene in 1878 and of physiological and pathological chemistry in 1881, Roster, between 1885 and 1889, conducted numerous researches on air, water, and soil in Florence, for which he set up his own chemistry laboratory.

From 1886 to 1895, Roster was a member of the commission established by the Municipality of Florence for the control of drinking water, and for about thirty years, he was a member of the Provincial Health Council. The results of his analyses led him to advocate for a radical improvement in the hygienic-sanitary conditions of the citizens of Florence: the analyses on the quality and purity of the water conducted in his laboratory were indeed negative and led him to request immediate intervention from the authorities.

To these types of research were added Roster's many other interests: botany, mineralogy, and photography. Each of these fields of study saw him engaged in research activities, resulting in over two hundred publications bearing his name, including monographs and articles published in specialized journals.

The long summer periods that Roster spent at Villa dell'Ottonella near Portoferraio, on the Island of Elba, since 1875, were fundamental for his mineralogical and botanical research: thus arose a mineralogical museum, later merged into the Museum of Natural History of Florence, also thanks to his close relationship with Raffaello Foresi, and an acclimatization garden for exotic plants created, starting from 1895, at the same villa.

In the field of photography, especially in relation to its applications in the scientific field, Roster was an experimenter. He produced many images, from photomicrographs, made with an instrument he himself devised for cytological, anatomical, and entomological studies, to telephotographs, executed with a telephoto lens once again adapted by him to represent objects at different distances, to the filming of solar spots. This interest led him to publish essays in specialized journals, and in 1890 he was made President of the Italian Photographic Society of Florence, a position he held until 1894.

In 1896, he was appointed Officer of the Order of Saints Maurice and Lazarus for his use of telephotography in military reconnaissance. The camera used for this purpose by Roster is permanently exhibited at the museum of the Military Geographic Institute of Florence.

== The Roster Library and Archive ==
In his life as a scientist and photographer, Giorgio Roster collected a rich library and produced an extensive documentary and photographic archive.

A large part of Roster's private library, totaling about 1400 volumes for 1050 titles, is deposited at the Foresiana Municipal Library of Portoferraio. The archival material is instead distributed among various institutions: the Museo Nazionale Alinari della Fotografia, where 1964 images attributable to Roster are preserved, including negative plates and glass slides, the latter kept in their original boxes, in addition to other boxes of various photographers purchased for educational and study purposes; the State Artistic Lyceum of Porta Romana and Sesto Fiorentino, where 38 photographic plates are located, as well as three handwritten booklets titled by Roster Catalogo delle negative; the Foresiana Municipal Library and Pinacoteca of Portoferraio, where photographs, telephotographs, stereographs, and photomicrographs accompanied by handwritten sheets with related technical annotations are preserved; the botany section of the Museum of Natural History at the University of Florence, which houses two collections of plant specimens, 545 glass negatives, still mostly in their original boxes, and 95 photographic prints; the library of the Museo Galileo, where about 50 handwritten documents, about 250 photographs, microphotographs, and telephotographs, and 140 photographic plates, also accompanied by autographed technical annotations, are preserved. The deposits of the Museo Galileo also include a complete camera with tripod and a series of lenses donated by the Roster family.

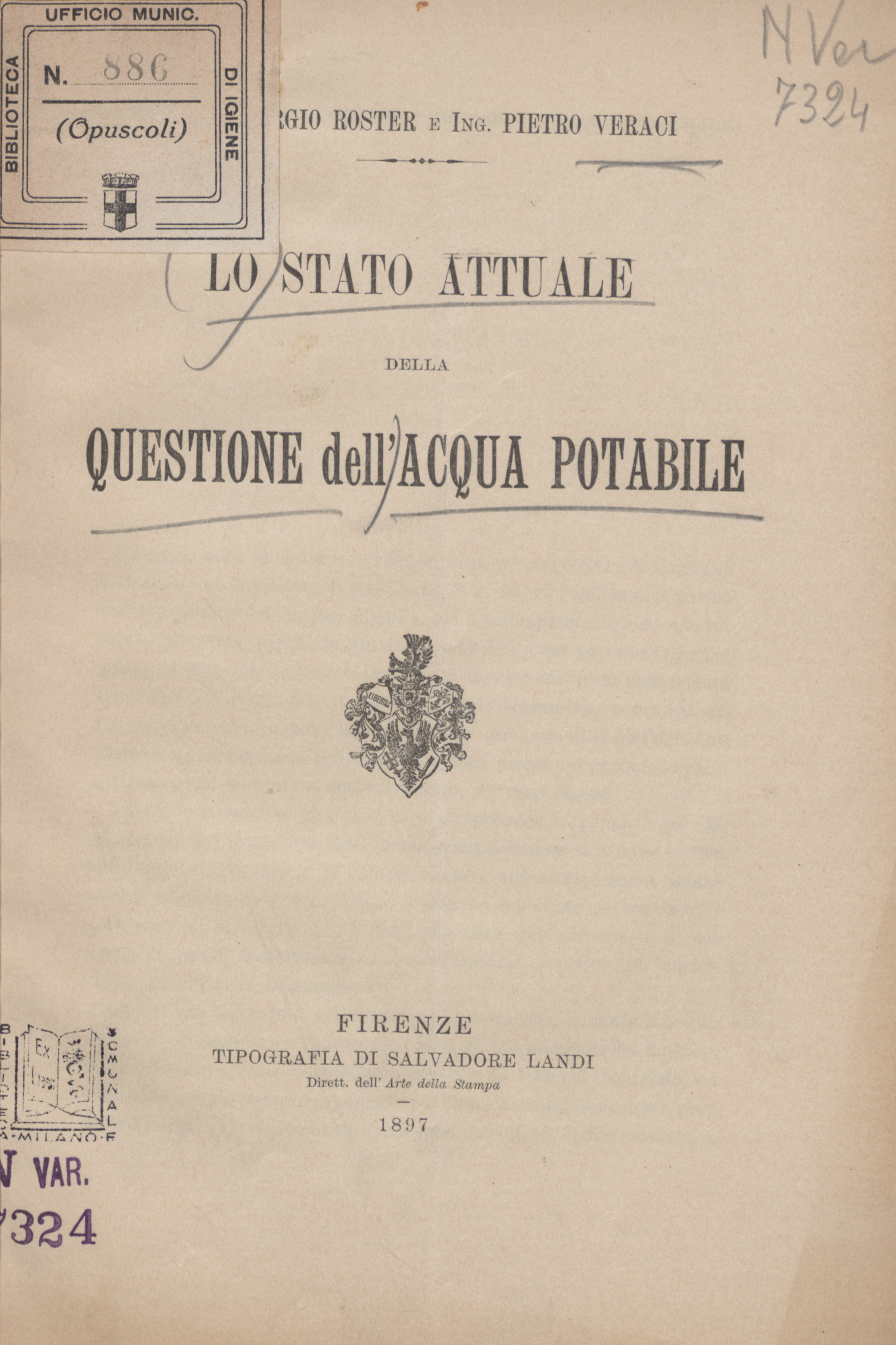
Lo stato attuale della questione dell'acqua potabile (1897)

The mineralogy section of the Museum of Natural History at the University of Florence preserves Giorgio Roster's mineralogical collection, accompanied by the manuscript catalogs he created himself.

== Works ==
- Roster, Giorgio (1897). Lo stato attuale della questione dell'acqua potabile. Florence: Tipografia di Salvadore Landi.

== Bibliography ==
- Giorgio Roster scienziato e fotografo, virtual exhibition by the Museo Galileo
- Alberto Giordano, Il fondo dell'igienista Giorgio Roster presso la Biblioteca comunale di Portoferraio, Rivista italiana di studi napoleonici, vol. 30, no. 2, 1993, pp. 97–169
- Annarita Caputo, La sperimentazione fotografica di Giorgio Roster: gli appunti e le lastre fotografiche, AFT, vol. 10, no. 19, 1994, pp. 4–9
- Franca Principe, Nadia Sensi, Stefano Casati, Il Fondo Roster dell'Istituto e Museo di storia della scienza di Firenze, AFT, vol. 20, no. 39/40, 2004, pp. 3–20
- Sabina Bernacchini, La fotografia e le scienze botaniche: il Fondo Roster del Museo di storia naturale di Firenze, AFT, vol. 23, no. 46, 2007, pp. 19–42
