= Rivière =

Rivière, La Rivière, or Les Rivières (French for "river") may refer to:

== Places ==
=== Belgium ===
- Rivière, Profondeville, a village

=== Canada ===
- La Rivière, Manitoba, a community
- Les Rivières (Quebec City), a borough

=== France ===
- La Rivière, Gironde
- Rivière, Indre-et-Loire
- La Rivière, Isère
- Rivière, Pas-de-Calais
- La Rivière, Réunion, home of the SS Rivière Sport football club

== Other uses ==
- Rivière, a style of necklace or bracelet
- "Riviere", a 2006 song by Deftones from Saturday Night Wrist

== People with the surname ==
- Ann Rivière (1810–1884), opera singer known by her married name of Anna Bishop
- Beatrice Rivière, French applied mathematician
- Briton Rivière (1840–1920), British artist
- Camden Riviere (born 1987), American court tennis World Champion
- Charles Marie Rivière (1845–?), French botanist abbreviated C.Rivière
- Daniel Riviere (1780–1854), English miniaturist, and father of a family of noted artists and singers
- Émile Rivière (1835–1922), French archaeologist
- Emmanuel Rivière (born 1990), French footballer
- Enrique Pichon-Rivière (1907–1977), Argentine psychiatrist
- Georges Henri Rivière (1897–1985), French museologist
- Henri Rivière (naval officer) (1827–1883), French naval commander involved in the conquest of northern Vietnam
- Henri Rivière (painter) (1864–1951), French artist, designer and theatrical technician
- Henri Rivière (bobsleigh) (1922–1989), French Olympic bobsledder
- Hugh Goldwin Rivière (1869–1956), British portraitist
- Jacques Rivière (1886–1925), French writer
- Jean-François Rivière (born 1977), French footballer
- Jean-Max Rivière (1937–2025), French singer-songwriter
- Jérôme Rivière (born 1964), French politician and lawyer
- Joan Riviere (1883–1962), British psychoanalyst
- Joannès Rivière (born 1979), French chef, restaurateur and cookbook author
- Marc Rivière (1950–2025), French director, actor and screenwriter
- Marc Rivière (pastry chef) (born 1969), French pastry chef
- Margarita Rivière (1944–2015), Spanish journalist and writer
- Marie Auguste Rivière (1821–1877), French botanist
- Osborne Riviere (1932–2017), Dominican politician
- Paul Rivière (1912–1998), French Resistance fighter and politician
- Robert Riviere (1808–1882), English bookbinder
- Roger Rivière (1936–1976), French cyclist
- Roger-Arnould Rivière (1930–1959), French poet
- Romaine Rivière, birth name of Romaine-la-Prophétesse (1750-?), Haitian revolutionary
- Sam Riviere (born 1981), English poet and publisher
- Théonie Rivière Mignot (1819–1875), American restaurateur
- Yohann Rivière (born 1984), French footballer

== See also ==
- Rio (disambiguation)
- Ríos (disambiguation)
- Rive (disambiguation)
- River (disambiguation)
- Rivers (disambiguation)
- La Rivière-de-Corps
- La Rivière-Drugeon
- La Rivière-Enverse
- Rivière-les-Fosses, a commune in the Haute-Marne département
- Rivière-Pilote, a commune in the Martinique overseas département
- Rivière-Saas-et-Gourby, a commune in the Landes département
- La Rivière-Saint-Sauveur
- Rivière-Salée, a commune in the Martinique overseas département
- Rivière-sur-Tarn, a commune in the Aveyron département
- Rivières, Charente, in the Charente département
- Rivières, Gard, in the Gard département
- Rivières, Tarn, in the Tarn département
- Les Rivières-Henruel, in the Marne département
- Rivières-le-Bois, in the Haute-Marne département
