= Rives =

Rive (plural: rives) is a French word meaning "bank" (of a river). It may also refer to:

== Places ==
=== France ===
- Rives, Isère, a commune
- Rives, Lot-et-Garonne, a commune
- Les Rives, a commune in the Hérault department

=== United States ===
- Rives Township, Michigan
- Rives, Missouri, a town
- Rives, Tennessee, a town

== People ==
- Alexander Rives (1806–1885), American attorney, politician, judge and plantation owner
- Alfred L. Rives (1830–1903), American engineer, son of William Cabell Rives
- Amélie Rives Troubetzkoy (1863–1945), née Rives, American author of novels, poetry and plays
- André Rives (1924–2017), French rugby league footballer
- Ángela García Rives (1891–1968 or later) Spanish librarian and archivist
- Bob Rives (1903–1956), American football player
- Caridad Rives Arcayna (born 1972), Spanish politician
- Don Rives (born 1951), American former National Football League player
- Francis E. Rives (1792–1861), American politician, businessman and planter
- George L. Rives (1849–1917), American lawyer, politician, author and United States Assistant Secretary of State
- Gustave Rives (1858–1926), French architect
- Hallie Erminie Rives (1874–1956), American novelist
- Jack L. Rives (born 1952), American former lieutenant general, former Judge Advocate General of the United States Air Force and CEO of the American Bar Association
- Jean Baptiste Rives Rives (1793–1833), French adventurer who served in the court of the Kingdom of Hawaii
- Jean-Pierre Rives (born 1952), French former rugby union player and visual artist
- Richard Rives (1895–1982), American lawyer and judge
- Thomas Rives, speaker of the House of Assembly of Jamaica in 1688
- William Cabell Rives (1793–1868), American lawyer, planter, politician and diplomat, twice US Minister to France
- Zeno J. Rives (1874–1939), American politician and lawyer
- J. Rives Childs (1893–1987), American diplomat and writer
- Rives Kistler (born 1949), American attorney and judge
- Rives McBee (1938–2023), American golfer
- Rives (poet) (born 1968), American poet

== Other uses ==
- Rives (grape), a French wine grape

== See also ==
- Rives-Dervoises, Haute-Marne, France
- Rive (disambiguation)
- Rio (disambiguation)
- Ríos (disambiguation)
