= Museo Nazionale Alinari della Fotografia =

Former museum in Florence, Italy

Coordinates: 43°46′23″N 11°14′57″E

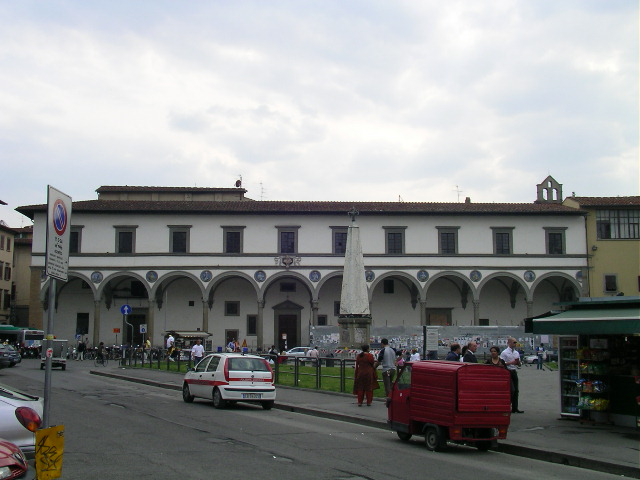
- Ospedale di San Paolo, which houses the museum
- Location: Piazza Santa Maria Novella, Florence, Italy

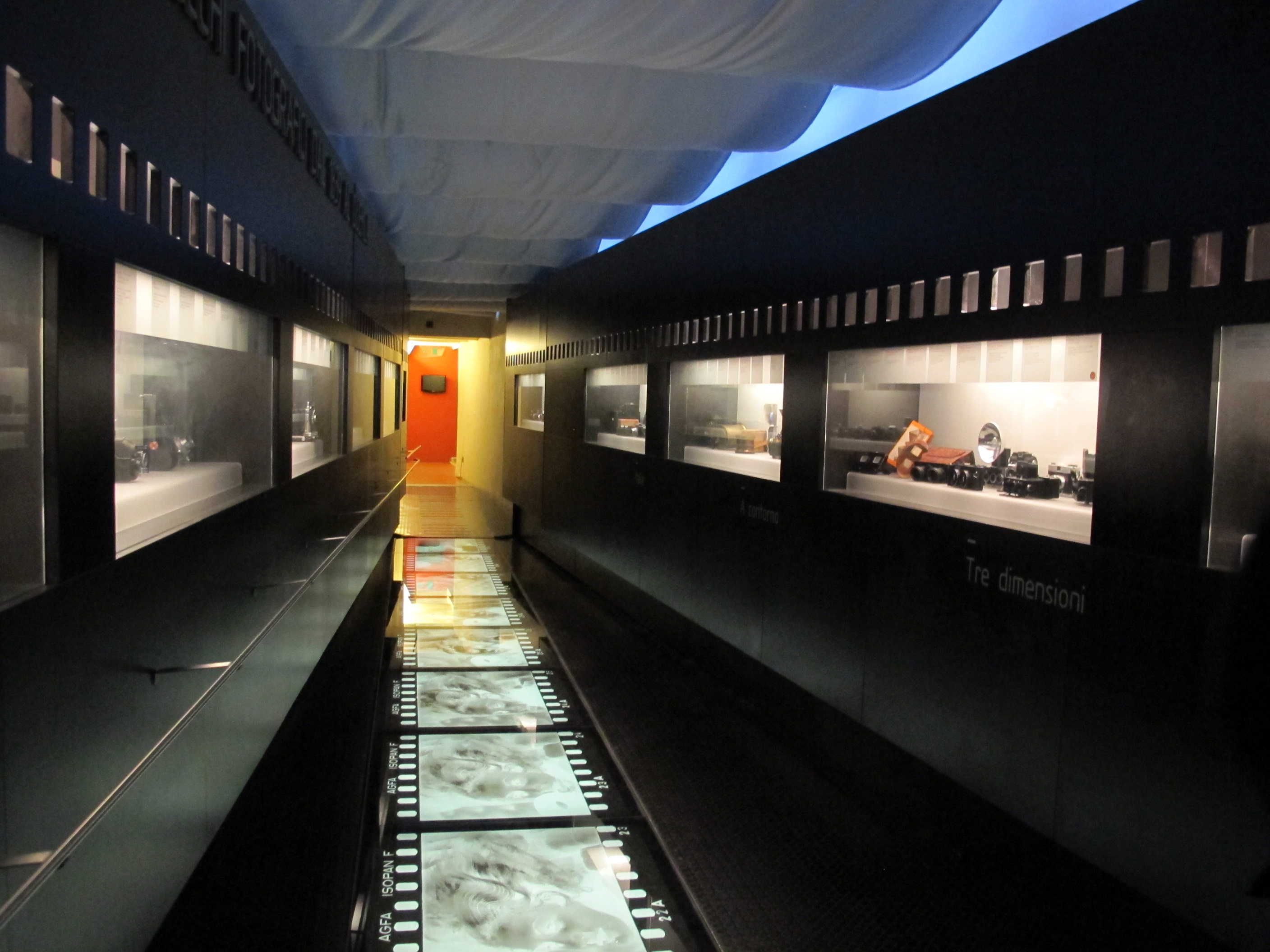
Interior

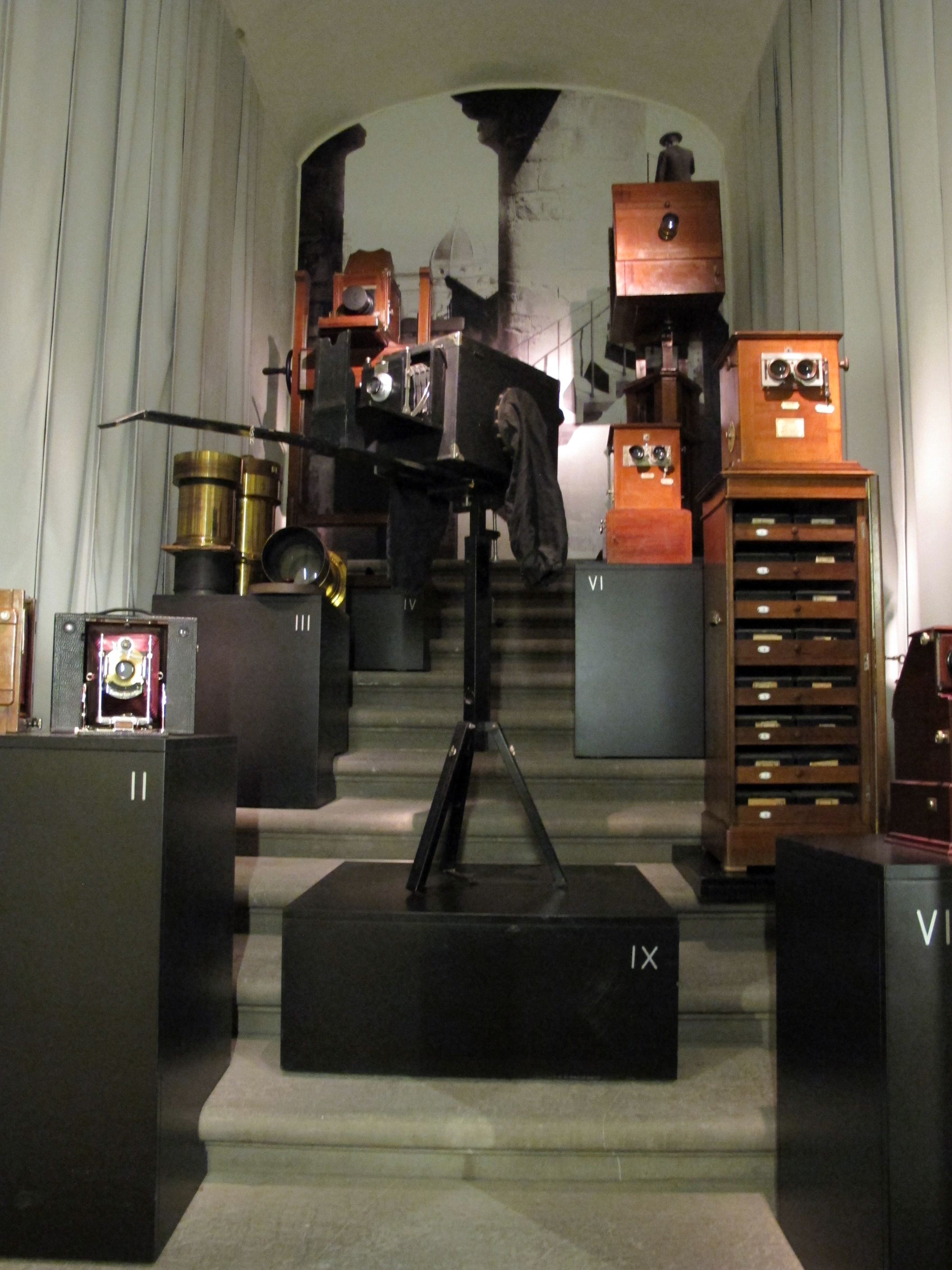
Interior

The Museo Nazionale Alinari della Fotografia (MNAF - National Museum Alinari of Photography), formerly Museo della Storia della Fotografia Fratelli Alinari is a photography museum located in part of the premises of the former Ospedale di San Paolo in the Piazza Santa Maria Novella in Florence, region of Tuscany, Italy). It hosts special exhibitions on a regular basis and possesses 350.000 vintage prints from the 19th and 20th centuries. The museum closed in 2012.

Since 1 November 2006 it is located in the Ospedale di San Paolo, a former pilgrims' hostel that was later transformed into a school. Before that, the museum was in the Palazzo Rucellai and in the premises of the Fratelli Alinari. It was the first museum of Italy to be devoted exclusively to photography.

The collection is continuously expanded with acquisitions and donations and contains works by, among others:

- Robert Anderson
- Vincenzo Balocchi
- Carlo Baravalle
- Felice Beato
- Alphonse Bernoud
- Samuel Bourne
- Bill Brandt
- Roger Fenton
- Frédéric Flacheron
- Wilhelm von Gloeden
- Paul Graham
- Robert Macpherson
- Carlo Mollino
- Luciano Morpurgo
- Carlo Naya
- Mario Nunes Vais
- Domenico Riccardo Peretti Griva
- Giuseppe Primoli
- Roberto Rive
- James Robertson
- Giorgio Sommer
- Giuseppe Wulz

The museum exhibits also thousands of photo albums, cameras, objectives and other objects connected with the history of photography.

== Bibliography ==
- Amedeo Benedetti, "I Fratelli Alinari", in Gli archivi delle immagini, Genova, Erga, 2000, pp. 348–358.
