= Otto Kühne =

Otto Kühne (12 May 1893, in Berlin – 8 December 1955, in Brandenburg an der Havel) was a German communist militant, who led a maquis group of German antifascist fighters in the French region of Lozère in 1943 and 1944 during World War II.

A railwayman by profession, Kühne had been a communist deputy during the Reichstag fire, and had subsequently fled to France.

== The maquis de Lozère ==
At the beginning of the war, Kühne was interned by the Vichy regime and sent to a foreign workers' camp in Chanac in the Lozère département, where he formed a resistance group with former members of the International Brigades which was first attached to the Combat network in spring 1942. He was in contact with the leadership of the KPD and with the Lyon-based Free Germany Committee.

In spring 1942, Kühne was one of the founders of the Maquis de Bonnecombe. At the time he used the false name "Monsieur Schumann" and attempted to develop contacts with the Parti communiste français. This was not without difficulties; his initial attempts were met with mistrust, for fear of infiltration by Gestapo moles. Nonetheless, the German anti-fascists found strong support among the Protestant-majority population of Cévennes.

Kühne quickly became the leader of this maquis, with a reputation for solidity, intransigence and inflexibility. He became the political officer for the "Montaigne" maquis which merged three German maquis at the beginning of 1944.

Kühne fought in the battles of 7–8 April 1944 at Saint-Étienne-Vallée-Française (Lozère), where the German maquis destroyed a patrol of the Feldgendarmerie and in an ambush against the Waffen SS on 5 June 1944 at La Rivière. (Note: There are several places in France called La Rivière, and the sources do not say at which one this ambush took place. None of those with articles in English or French Wikipedia is in Lozère, or would have been easy for maquisards to get to from Lozère during the German occupation. One possibility is La Rivière near Saint-Privat-de-Vallongue, which is about 10 kilometres (6.2 mi) north of Saint-Étienne-Vallée-Française.) He was leading a small group of about 10 maquisards when the maquis dispersed to evade an attempted encirclement by the SS reacting to these maquis operations. When the various elements of the German maquis reformed at the Plan de Fontmort, a high place of resistance of the Camisards, Kühne took command. He worked with the French "Bir Hakeim", although this was not without conflict. The GMR and the milice were tracking them in the mountains. The Wehrmacht attacked the "Bir Hakeim" group at La Borie-La Parade on Pentecost Sunday. The fighting left 61 dead; those maquisards who surrendered were executed. Kühne's group lost about ten men.

He also fought in the battles for French liberation, welcoming deserters from the Wehrmacht (particularly Armenians) in the Mende region. At that time, he connected with the FTP-MOI. His resistance name became "Robert", and he was given military responsibility within FTP-MOI for the Lozère, the Gard and the Ardèche. In June 1944, he was promoted to lieutenant-colonel and decorated with the Croix de Guerre with a bronze star. By the next month, he had more than 2,000 FTP fighters under his command.

Kühne seems not to have participated in the liberation of Nîmes in person, or in the parade of 4 September (unlike other German anti-fascists). He quickly returned to Lyon, where he participated in the "Free Germany Committee" (CALPO).

== Bibliography ==
- Evelyne et Yvan Brès, Un maquis d'antifascistes allemands en France (1942-1944), Les Presses du Languedoc - Max Chaleil éditeur, 1987 ISBN 2-85998-038-5 (French)
