= Saint-André-les-Vergers =

Commune in Grand Est, France

- Commune
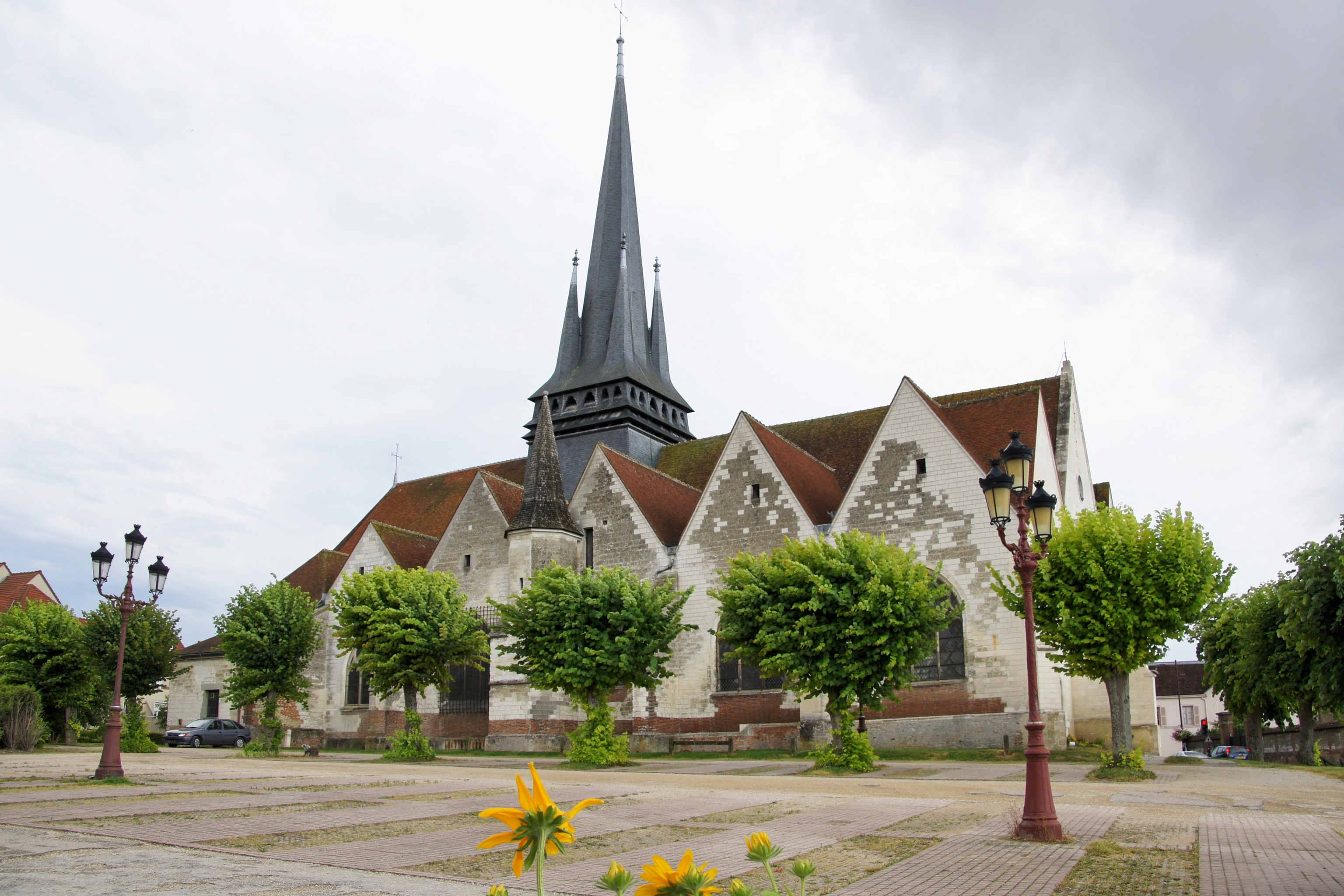
- The church in Saint-André-les-Vergers

- Coat of arms
- Location of Saint-André-les-Vergers
- Location within France Location within Grand Est
- Coordinates: 48°16′50″N 4°03′17″E
- Country: France
- Region: Grand Est
- Department: Aube
- Arrondissement: Troyes
- Canton: Saint-André-les-Vergers
- Intercommunality: CA Troyes Champagne Métropole

Government
  - Mayor (2020–2026): Catherine Ledouble
- Area^{1}: 5.86 km^{2} (2.26 sq mi)
- Elevation: 113 m (371 ft)
- Highest elevation: 129 m (423 ft)
- Lowest elevation: 106 m (348 ft)
- Population (2023): 12,806
  - Density: 2,190/km^{2} (5,660/sq mi)
- Time zone: UTC+01:00 (CET)
  - Summer (DST): UTC+02:00 (CEST)
- INSEE/Postal code: 10333 /10120
- ^{1} French Land Register data, which excludes lakes, ponds, glaciers > 1 km^{2} (0.386 sq mi or 247 acres) and river estuaries.

Saint-André-les-Vergers (French pronunciation: [sɛ̃t‿ɑ̃dʁe le vɛʁʒe] lit. 'Saint Andrew-the-Orchards') is a commune in the Aube department in north-central France.

== Population ==
Historical population
Year	Pop.	±% p.a.
1968	7,660	—
1975	10,370	+4.42%
1982	10,681	+0.42%
1990	11,329	+0.74%
1999	11,125	−0.20%
2007	11,088	−0.04%
2012	11,528	+0.78%
2017	12,311	+1.32%
2023	12,806	+0.66%
Source: INSEE

== See also ==
- Communes of the Aube department
