= Saint-Germain, Aube =

Commune in Grand Est, France

Saint-Germain
- Commune
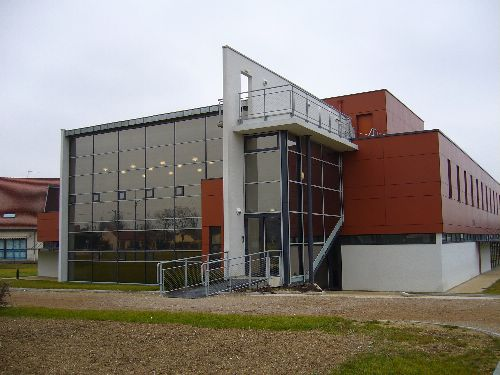
- The library in Saint-Germain

- Coat of arms
- Location of Saint-Germain
- Location within France Location within Grand Est
- Coordinates: 48°15′31″N 4°01′57″E
- Country: France
- Region: Grand Est
- Department: Aube
- Arrondissement: Troyes
- Canton: Saint-André-les-Vergers
- Intercommunality: CA Troyes Champagne Métropole

Government
  - Mayor (2020–2026): Maxime Dusacq
- Area^{1}: 13.8 km^{2} (5.3 sq mi)
- Elevation: 121 m (397 ft)
- Highest elevation: 252 m (827 ft)
- Lowest elevation: 113 m (371 ft)
- Population (2023): 2,437
  - Density: 177/km^{2} (457/sq mi)
- Time zone: UTC+01:00 (CET)
  - Summer (DST): UTC+02:00 (CEST)
- INSEE/Postal code: 10340 /10120
- ^{1} French Land Register data, which excludes lakes, ponds, glaciers > 1 km^{2} (0.386 sq mi or 247 acres) and river estuaries.

Saint-Germain (French pronunciation: [sɛ̃ ʒɛʁmɛ̃]) is a commune in the Aube department in north-central France.

== Population ==
Historical population
Year	Pop.	±% p.a.
1968	564	—
1975	985	+8.29%
1982	1,116	+1.80%
1990	1,763	+5.88%
1999	2,152	+2.24%
2007	2,351	+1.11%
2012	2,275	−0.66%
2017	2,304	+0.25%
2023	2,437	+0.94%
Source: INSEE

== See also ==
- Communes of the Aube department
