= List of protected heritage sites in Profondeville =

This table shows an overview of the protected heritage sites in the Walloon town Profondeville. This list is part of Belgium's national heritage.

Object	Year/architect	Town/section	Address	Coordinates	Number^{?}	Image
Ensemble of the chapel of Saint-Roch, the two trees and the surrounding area ^{(nl)} ^{(fr)}		Profondeville		50.374538°N 4.773557°E	92101-CLT-0003-01 Info	Ensemble van de kapel Saint-Roch, de twee bomen en het omliggende terrein
Cemetery Chapel ^{(nl)} ^{(fr)}		Profondeville		50.373215°N 4.779958°E	92101-CLT-0004-01 Info	Kerkhofkapel
Chantoir "Trou des Nutons" ^{(nl)} ^{(fr)}		Profondeville		50.380114°N 4.794745°E	92101-CLT-0007-01 Info	
Chapel "au Loup" ensemble with its surroundings ^{(nl)} ^{(fr)}		Profondeville	route de Saint-Gérard	50.369771°N 4.769915°E	92101-CLT-0008-01 Info	
Cave and re-welling of the Vilaine ^{(nl)} ^{(fr)}		Profondeville		50.373535°N 4.821540°E	92101-CLT-0009-01 Info	
Chantoir of Normont ^{(nl)} ^{(fr)}		Profondeville		50.370806°N 4.804049°E	92101-CLT-0010-01 Info	
Double Chantoir du Moulin ^{(nl)} ^{(fr)}		Profondeville		50.381861°N 4.778985°E	92101-CLT-0011-01 Info	
Chantoir of Trou du Renard ^{(nl)} ^{(fr)}		Profondeville		50.379942°N 4.764788°E	92101-CLT-0012-01 Info	
Cave of Trou d'Haquin ^{(nl)} ^{(fr)}		Profondeville		50.368667°N 4.904320°E	92101-CLT-0013-01 Info	
castle Lesve ^{(nl)} ^{(fr)}		Profondeville		50.372643°N 4.779721°E	92101-CLT-0014-01 Info	Kasteel Lesve
Surfacing from the 19th century towpath, between the river and Rouillon ^{(nl)} ^{(fr)}		Profondeville		50.353360°N 4.875942°E	92101-CLT-0015-01 Info	
Rochers de Frêne ^{(nl)} ^{(fr)}		Profondeville		50.380319°N 4.870066°E	92101-CLT-0016-01 Info	

== See also ==
- List of protected heritage sites in Namur (province)
- Profondeville
