= Rivers (disambiguation) =

Rivers are natural flowing watercourses.

Rivers may also refer to:

== Music ==
- Rivers (album), a 2010 album by Wildbirds & Peacedrums
- "Rivers" (Thomas Jack song), a 2015 song by Thomas Jack
- "Rivers" (Six60 song), a 2017 song by Six60
- "Rivers", a 2016 song by Chevelle from The North Corridor
- "Rivers (of the Hidden Funk)", a 1981 song by Joe Walsh from There Goes the Neighborhood

== People ==
- Rivers (surname)
- Rivers Cuomo (born 1970), American musician
- Rivers Rutherford (born 1967), American country music songwriter
- Samy Rivers (born 1998), Mexican internet celebrity

== Places ==
- Rivers, Manitoba, Canada
  - Rivers station, a railway station
- Rivers State, Nigeria
- Rivers, New Mexico, United States

== Television and film ==
- Rivers (Holidays in the Danger Zone), a 2006 British documentary travel TV series
- Rivers with Griff Rhys Jones, a 2009 British documentary TV series

== Titles ==
- Earl Rivers, a title in the Peerage of England
- Baron Rivers, four titles in various British peerages
- Rivers baronets, an extinct title in the Baronetage of England

== Other uses ==
- Rivers-class ocean liner, a group of 19th-century German express liners
- Rivers School, in Weston, Massachusetts, US
- Rivers Casino (disambiguation)
- Shisen-sho or Rivers, a Japanese tile-based game
- Rivers FC, a Canadian soccer team
- Rivers United F.C., a Nigerian football team
- Rivers, an Australian clothing chain owned by Mosaic Brands
- Rivers State Television, a television station in Nigeria

== See also ==
- Lists of rivers
- River (disambiguation)
- Ríos (disambiguation)
