= Profondeville =

Municipality in Wallonia, Belgium

Profondeville Parfondveye (Walloon)
- Municipality
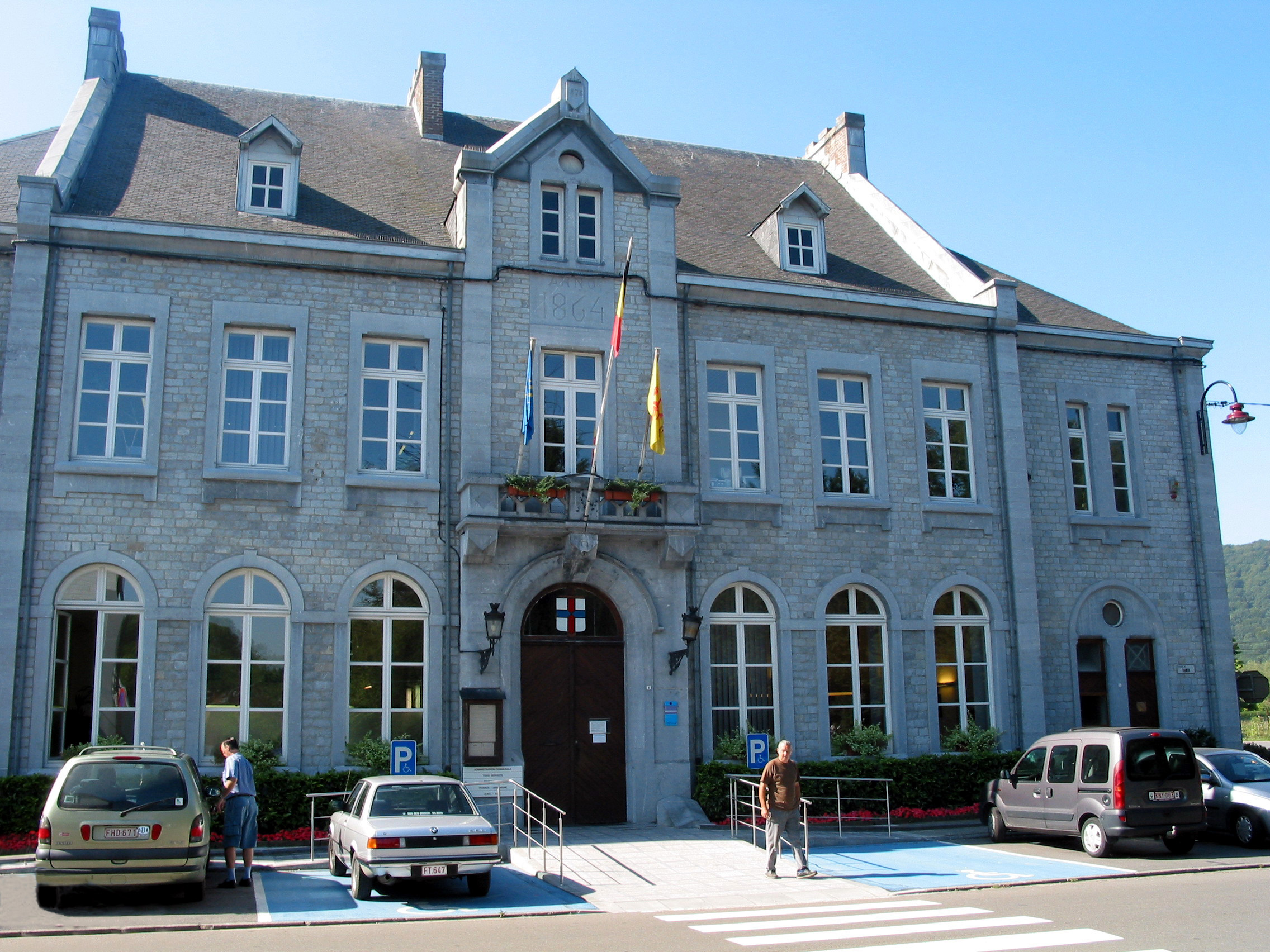
- The town hall

- Flag Coat of arms

- Location of Profondeville in Namur Province
- Interactive map of Profondeville
- Location in Belgium
- Coordinates: 50°23′N 04°52′E
- Country: Belgium
- Community: French Community
- Region: Wallonia
- Province: Namur
- Arrondissement: Namur

Government
  - Mayor: Luc Delire
  - Governing parties: MICS, Ecolo, PS

Area
  - Total: 50.37 km^{2} (19.45 sq mi)

Population (2018-01-01)
  - Total: 12,204
  - Density: 242.3/km^{2} (627.5/sq mi)
- Postal codes: 5170
- NIS code: 92101
- Area codes: 081
- Website: www.profondeville.be

Profondeville (French: [pʁɔ.fɔ̃d.vil]; Walloon: Parfondveye) is a municipality of Wallonia located in the province of Namur, Belgium.

On January 1, 2016, Profondeville had a total population of 12,117. The total area of the municipality is 50.34 km^{2} (19.44 sq mi) and the population density is 240.70 inhabitants per km^{2}.

The original municipality of Profondeville was expanded, during the post-1974 fusion of the Belgian municipalities, with the addition of the ancienne communes of Arbre, Bois-de-Villers, Lesve, Lustin, Rivière and the Lakisse area from the southeast of the newly-adjoining municipality of Floreffe.

== Gallery ==
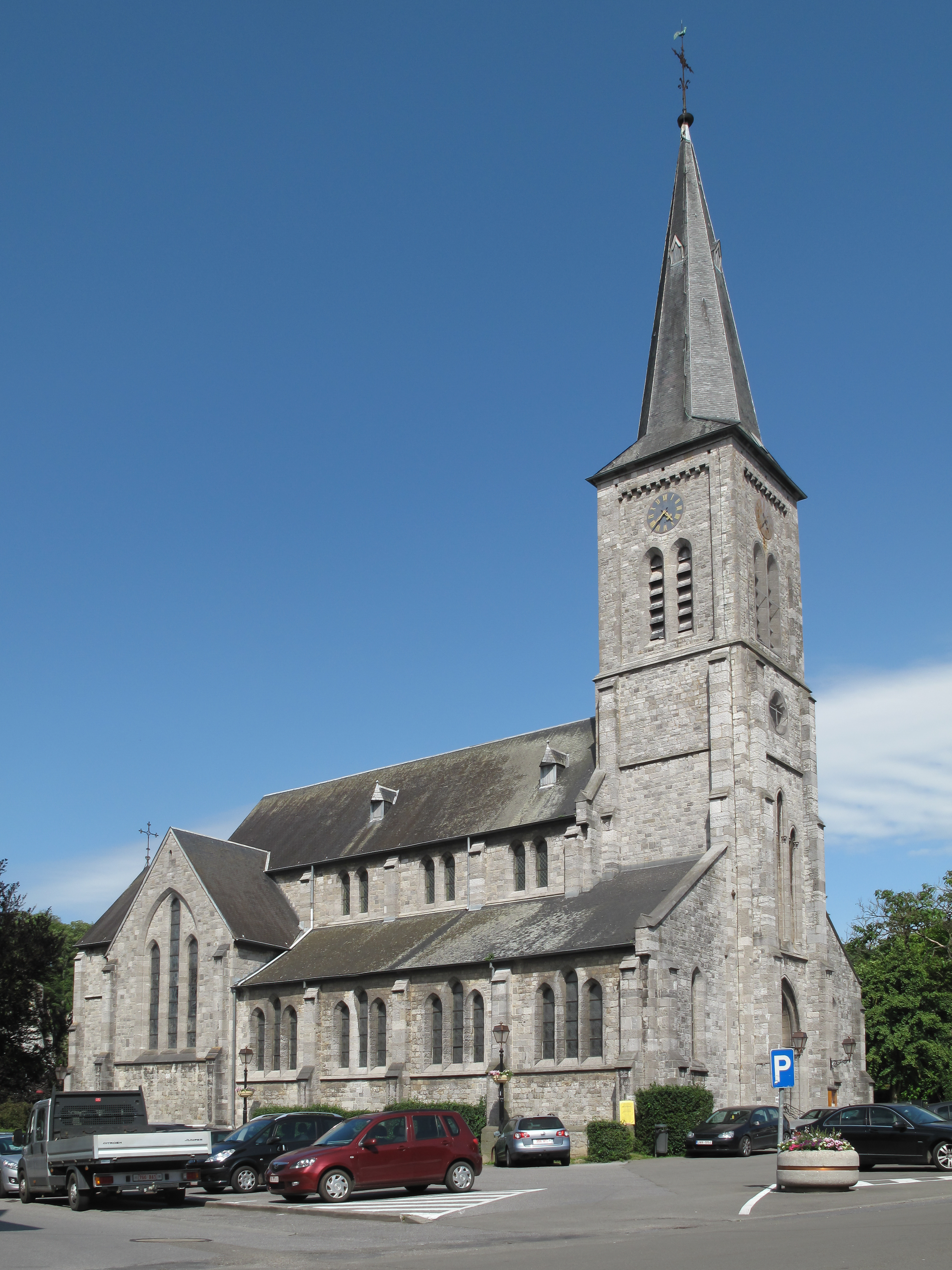
Profondeville, church: église Saint-Remy

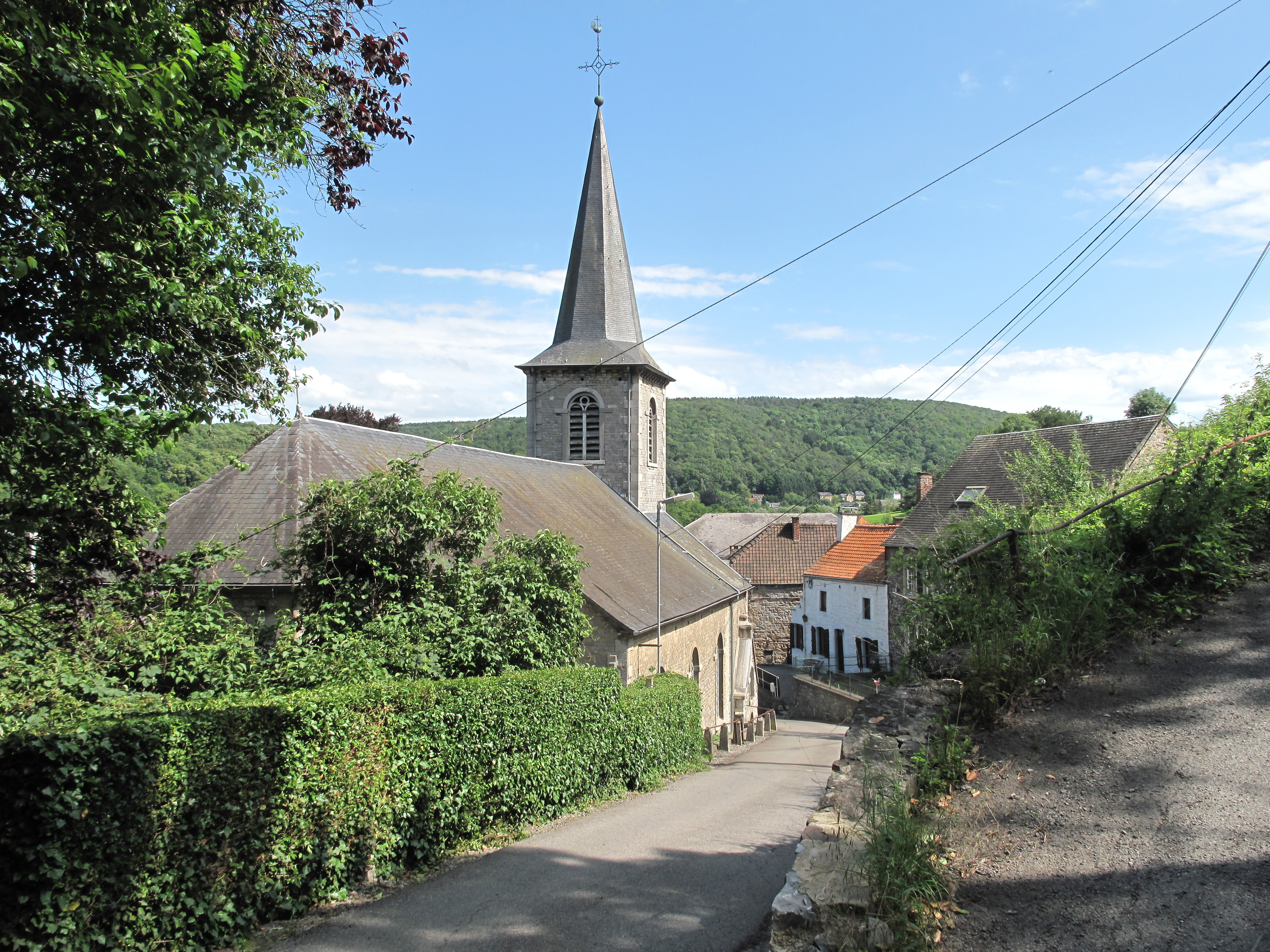
Rivière, church

== Twin towns ==
- Roquebrune-Cap-Martin, France

== See also ==
- List of protected heritage sites in Profondeville
