= Torvilliers =

Commune in Grand Est, France

- Commune
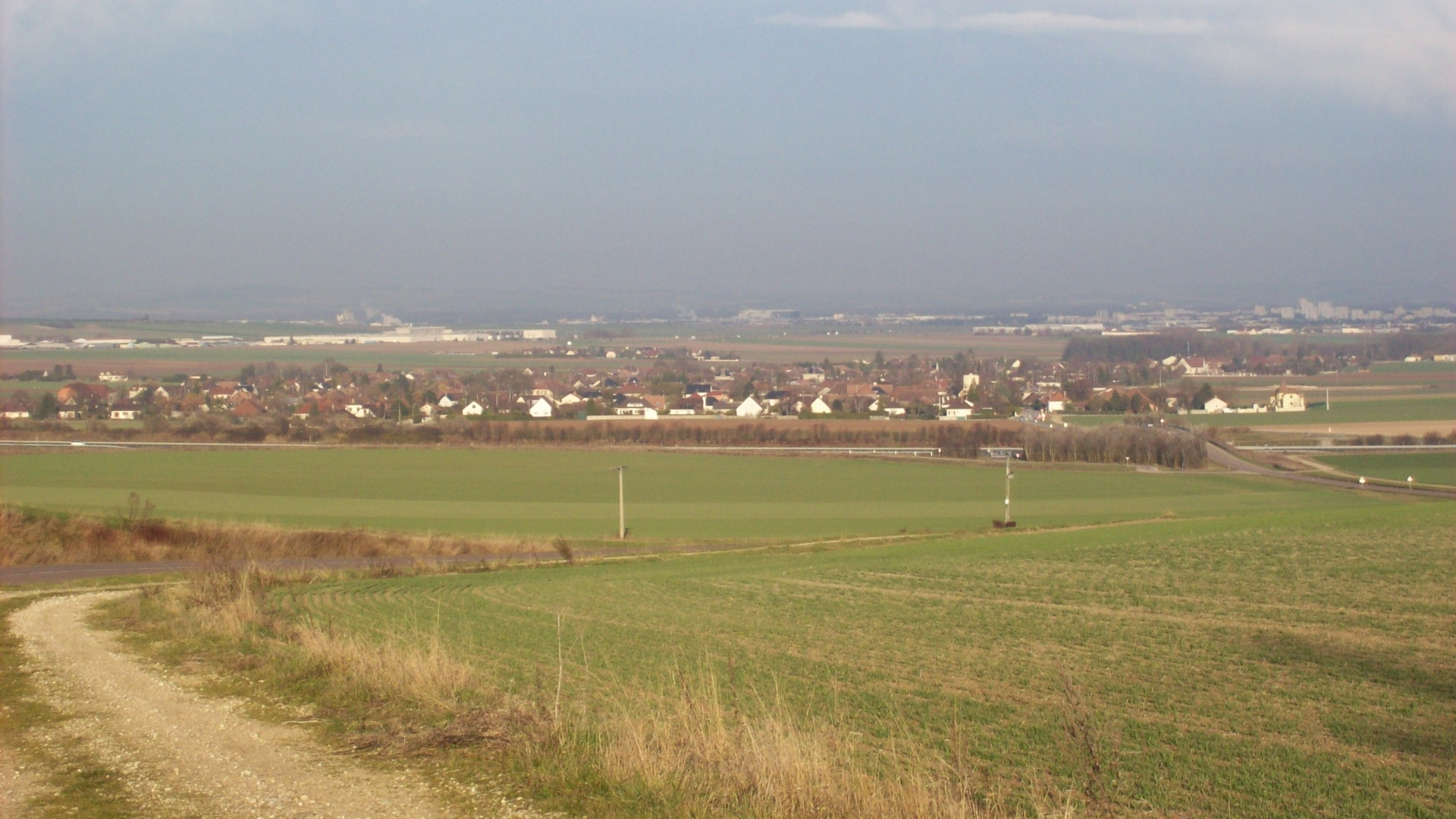
- A general view of Torvilliers

- Coat of arms
- Location of Torvilliers
- Location within France Location within Grand Est
- Coordinates: 48°16′35″N 3°58′37″E
- Country: France
- Region: Grand Est
- Department: Aube
- Arrondissement: Troyes
- Canton: Saint-André-les-Vergers
- Intercommunality: CA Troyes Champagne Métropole

Government
  - Mayor (2020–2026): Bruno Gantelet
- Area^{1}: 12.11 km^{2} (4.68 sq mi)
- Elevation: 137 m (449 ft)
- Population (2023): 1,028
  - Density: 84.89/km^{2} (219.9/sq mi)
- Time zone: UTC+01:00 (CET)
  - Summer (DST): UTC+02:00 (CEST)
- INSEE/Postal code: 10381 /10440
- ^{1} French Land Register data, which excludes lakes, ponds, glaciers > 1 km^{2} (0.386 sq mi or 247 acres) and river estuaries.

Torvilliers (French pronunciation: [tɔʁvilje]) is a commune in the Aube department in north-central France.

== Population ==
Historical population
Year	Pop.	±% p.a.
1968	343	—
1975	495	+5.38%
1982	589	+2.51%
1990	767	+3.36%
1999	766	−0.01%
2007	839	+1.14%
2012	906	+1.55%
2017	969	+1.35%
2023	1,028	+0.99%
Source: INSEE

== See also ==
- Communes of the Aube department
