= Los Ríos =

Los Rios (Spanish word meaning The Rivers) may refer to:

- Los Ríos, Dominican Republic, a town in the Baoruco province of the Dominican Republic
- Los Ríos, Distrito Nacional, Dominican Republic
- Los Ríos Region, Chile
- Los Ríos Province, Ecuador
- Los Rios District, historic district in San Juan Capistrano, California, U.S.
  - Los Rios Street Historic District
- Los Rios, Panama, a township in the Panama Canal Zone

== See also ==
- Rios (disambiguation)
- Los Rios Community College District, California, U.S.
