= Global Village (TV series) =

- Created by: France 3
- Starring: Silvio Rivier
- Country of origin: Australia

Production
- Running time: 25 minutes

Original release
- Network: SBS
- Release: 30 November 1998 – 30 January 2015

Global Village was an Australian television show broadcast by the Australian public broadcaster SBS. The program was hosted by Silvio Rivier, who also did many of the voice overs. In 2008 it combined with Thalassa, a French documentary series, to expand its coverage of coastal areas.

Global Village covered communities from all over the globe. The show consisted of usually two, mostly short films 10–15 minutes long describing land and people all across the world. About 50% come from a French TV station and thus deal with topics from France, or, less frequently, its former colonies.

The main focus is to educate viewers about different cultures and working styles from around the world. Global Village has released two music CDs which contain a selection of music taken from the countries they visit.

== Timeslot ==
2007: 18:00–18:30 2008: 18:00–18:30 (Monday's showing is about cuisine and cooking)

== Cancellation ==
At the end of the episode on Friday 30 January 2015 Silvio Rivier announced that it had been the final episode and that the series was finishing. He noted that the series had been in production for just over 16 years, since late 1998, and that it was the longest-running in-house SBS program.
