= Rosières-près-Troyes =

Commune in Grand Est, France

- Commune
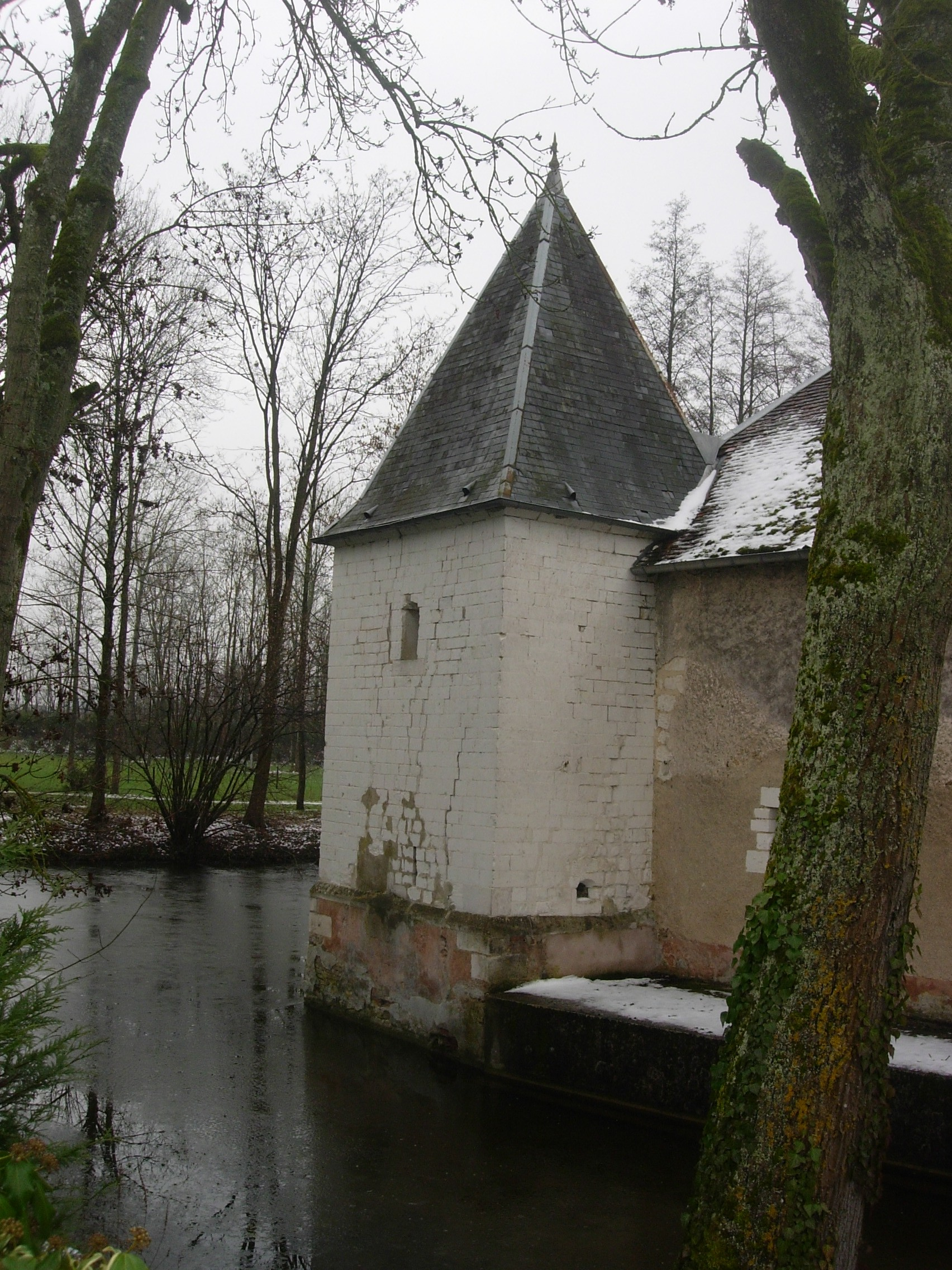
- Chateau

- Coat of arms
- Location of Rosières-près-Troyes
- Location within France Location within Grand Est
- Coordinates: 48°15′40″N 4°04′20″E
- Country: France
- Region: Grand Est
- Department: Aube
- Arrondissement: Troyes
- Canton: Saint-André-les-Vergers
- Intercommunality: CA Troyes Champagne Métropole

Government
  - Mayor (2021–2026): Arnaud Raymond
- Area^{1}: 6.23 km^{2} (2.41 sq mi)
- Elevation: 116 m (381 ft)
- Highest elevation: 130 m (430 ft)
- Lowest elevation: 112 m (367 ft)
- Population (2023): 4,840
  - Density: 777/km^{2} (2,010/sq mi)
- Time zone: UTC+01:00 (CET)
  - Summer (DST): UTC+02:00 (CEST)
- INSEE/Postal code: 10325 /10430
- ^{1} French Land Register data, which excludes lakes, ponds, glaciers > 1 km^{2} (0.386 sq mi or 247 acres) and river estuaries.

Rosières-près-Troyes (French pronunciation: [ʁozjɛʁ pʁɛ tʁwa], lit. 'Rosières near Troyes') is a commune in the Aube department in north-central France.

== Population ==
Historical population
Year	Pop.	±% p.a.
1968	527	—
1975	1,096	+11.03%
1982	1,804	+7.38%
1990	2,283	+2.99%
1999	2,608	+1.49%
2007	3,023	+1.86%
2012	3,648	+3.83%
2017	4,165	+2.69%
2023	4,840	+2.53%
Source: INSEE

== See also ==
- Communes of the Aube department
