= Belle Rive =

Belle Rive may refer to:

- Belle Rive, Illinois, United States
- Belle Rive, Edmonton, a neighborhood in Edmonton, Alberta, Canada

== See also ==
- Bellerive (disambiguation)
- Rive (disambiguation)
