= Canton of Saint-André-les-Vergers =

Coordinates: 48.28°N 4.05°E

- Canton
- Situation of the canton of Saint-André-les-Vergers in the department of Aube
- Country: France
- Region: Grand Est
- Department: Aube
- No. of communes: {{{nbcomm}}}
- Population (2023): 24,803
- INSEE code: 1010

The canton of Saint-André-les-Vergers is an administrative division of the Aube department, northeastern France. It was created at the French canton reorganisation which came into effect in March 2015. Its seat is in Saint-André-les-Vergers.

It consists of the following communes:

1. La Rivière-de-Corps
2. Rosières-près-Troyes
3. Saint-André-les-Vergers
4. Saint-Germain
5. Torvilliers
