= Bellerive =

Bellerive may refer to:

- Bellerive, Missouri, a suburb of St. Louis, United States
- Bellerive, Switzerland, municipality in the district of Avenches in the canton of Vaud
- Collonge-Bellerive, Switzerland, a municipality in the canton of Geneva
- Bellerive, Tasmania, Australia, a suburb of the City of Clarence, part of the greater Hobart area
- Bellerive Studios, films studios located in Zurich, Switzerland

== See also ==
- Belle Rive (disambiguation)
