= Rivers Casino =

Rivers Casino is the name of several casinos, including:

- Rivers Casino (Des Plaines)
- Rivers Casino Philadelphia
- Rivers Casino (Pittsburgh)
- Rivers Casino Portsmouth
- Rivers Casino (Schenectady)
