= King Trigger =

British band

King Trigger was a British band. They are best known for their single "The River" (called "River" on the single sleeve and on the LP track listing), which charted at No. 57 in the UK Singles Chart (four weeks in the chart, starting 14 August 1982), and No. 32 in Australia (three weeks in the chart, starting 1 November 1982).

The band formed as Screaming King Trigger, from a previous band called Scoop. They attracted the attention of the Thompson Twins, who gave them a support slot on a UK tour. This brought them to the attention of Chrysalis Records. They were on the cover of Melody Maker in February 1982, before they had even recorded.

They were covered in NME soon after (8 May 1982 issue), the journalist comparing their music to Pigbag, Bow Wow Wow and Adam and the Ants.

They recorded one album, Screaming, produced by Steve Lillywhite, in 1982. The album did not chart, and nor did the second single, "Temptation". The album was reissued in 2007.

== Members ==
- Trudi Baptiste - drums and vocals
- Martyn Clapson - guitar and vocals
- Ian Cleverly - percussion
- Sam Hodgkin - vocals
- Stuart Kennedy - bass and vocals

== Discography ==
=== Singles ===
"The River"

Single by King Trigger

from the album Screaming
- B-side: "Push or Slide"
- Released: 1982
- Label: Chrysalis
- Producer(s): Steve Lillywhite

King Trigger singles chronology
"The River"	"Temptation"

- "The River" / "Push or Slide" (7", Chrysalis CHS-2623)
- "The River (Extended Version)" / "Push Or Slide (Extended Version)" (12", Chrysalis CHS-12-2623)
- "Temptation" / "Running Away" (7", Chrysalis CHS-2651)
- "Temptation (Extended Version)" // "Temptation (Original Version)" / "Running Away" (12", Chrysalis CHS-12-2651)

=== Album ===
- Screaming (LP, Chrysalis L-37909)
  - A1 "Vodka"
  - A2 "Lay Your Hands On Me"
  - A3 "29 Ways"
  - A4 "Blood"
  - A5 "Fever"
  - B1 "River"
  - B2 "Shut Up"
  - B3 "Temptation"
  - B4 "Walking Poison"
  - B5 "Walk the Plank"
- 2007 reissue bonus tracks:
  - "River" (7" Version)
  - "River" (12" Version)
  - "Push Or Slide"
  - "Temptation" (12" Version)
  - "Running Away"
  - "Lay Your Hands On Me" (12" Version)
