= Silvio Rivier =

Australian television presenter

Silvio Rivier is a presenter on Australian television channel SBS who hosted Global Village for its entire run from 1998 to 2015.

== Career ==
Rivier began working at SBS in 1980 and has worked as a subtitler, news reader, voice actor, writer, producer, announcer, narrator, and presenter.

== Personal life ==
Rivier was born in Croatia and immigrated to Australia in 1961.

He has a Diploma in Opera from the Sydney Conservatorium of Music and a degree in Multicultural Journalism from the University of Wollongong. Rivier is a confirmed bachelor.
