= Senator Rivers =

Senator Rivers may refer to:

- Ann Rivers (born 1965 or 1966), Washington State Senate
- Cheryl Rivers (born 1951), Vermont State Senate
- Eurith D. Rivers (1895–1967), Georgia State Senate
- Ralph Rivers (1903–1976), Alaska Territorial Senate
