= Rivière, Profondeville =

Rivière Rivire (Walloon)
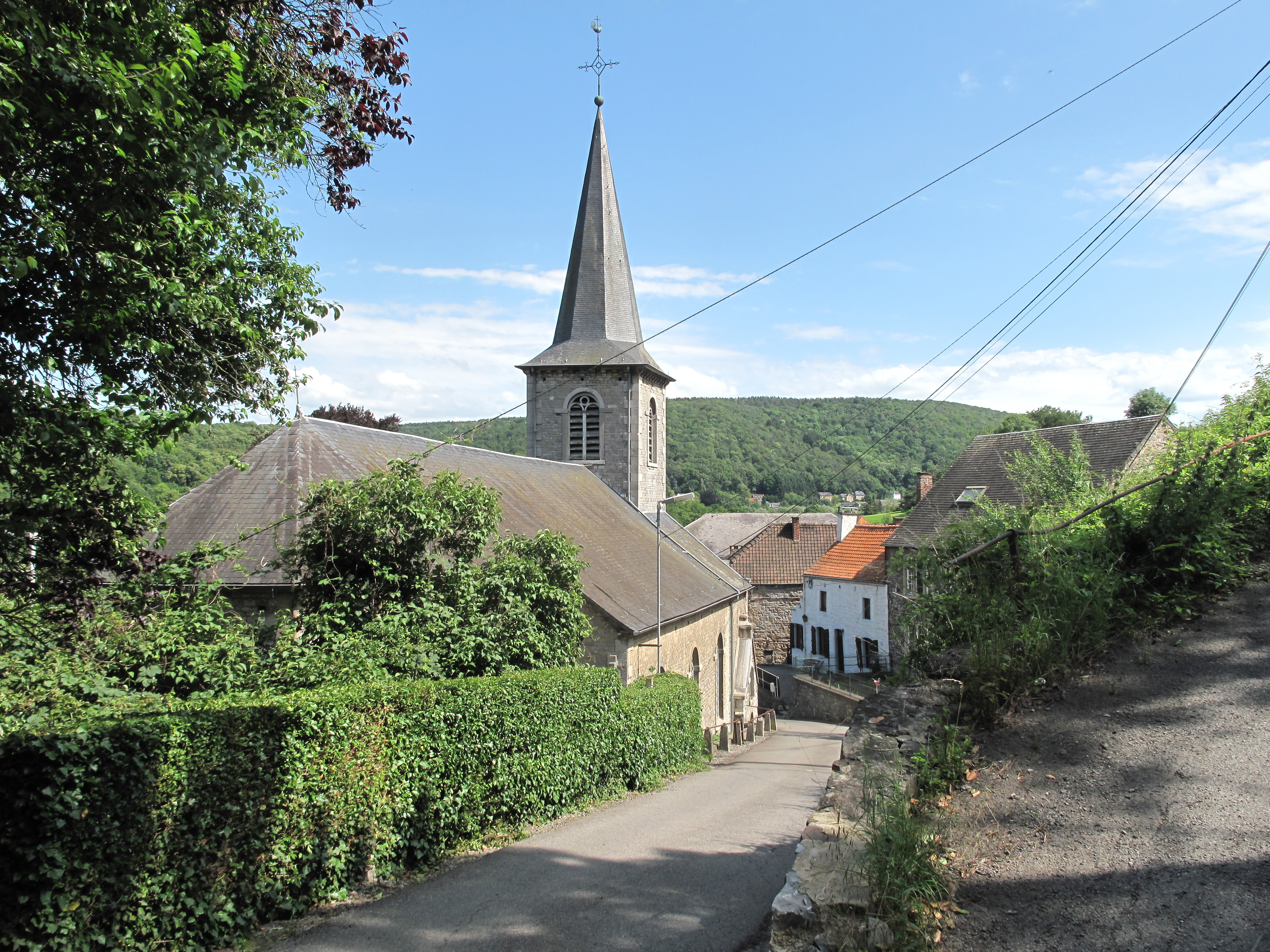
- Rivière

- Location within Belgium Location within Europe
- Coordinates: 50°24′00″N 04°54′00″E
- Country: Belgium
- Region: Wallonia
- Province: Namur
- Municipality: Profondeville

Rivière (French pronunciation: [ʁivjɛʁ]; Walloon: Rivire) is a village of Wallonia and a district of the municipality of Profondeville, located in the province of Namur, Belgium.

Remains dating back to the Magdalenian have been discovered in the village, and the area appears to have been permanently settled from the Mesolithic era. During the Middle Ages, the village was subservient to Anhée. A chapel was first built in the village in 1630; the presently visible village church was built 1844 to 1845. A castle has existed in the village, but it was burnt down in August 1914. During World War II, the entire village was severely damaged by fire in September 1944. Many civilians were also killed during the war during fighting in the village.
