= Piazza Santa Maria Novella =

City square in Florence, Italy

Coordinates: 43°46′24.62″N 11°14′57.92″E

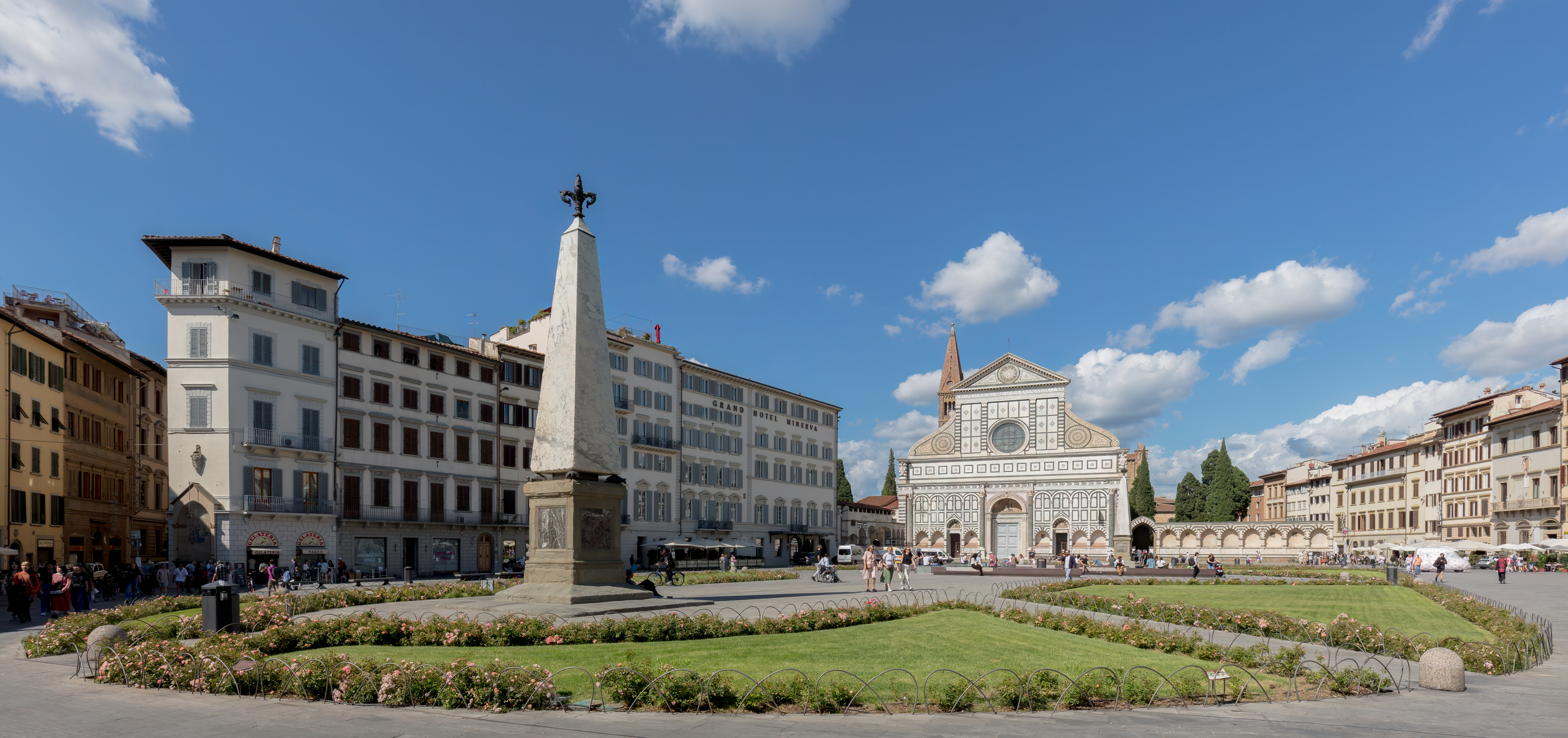
Piazza Santa Maria Novella

Piazza Santa Maria Novella is a city square in Florence, Italy. It has a number of important buildings surrounding it, including the church of Santa Maria Novella, several palazzi, the Museo Nazionale Alinari della Fotografia, and shopping and dining.

== Buildings around the square ==
- Basilica of Santa Maria Novella
- Museo Nazionale Alinari della Fotografia

== Gallery ==
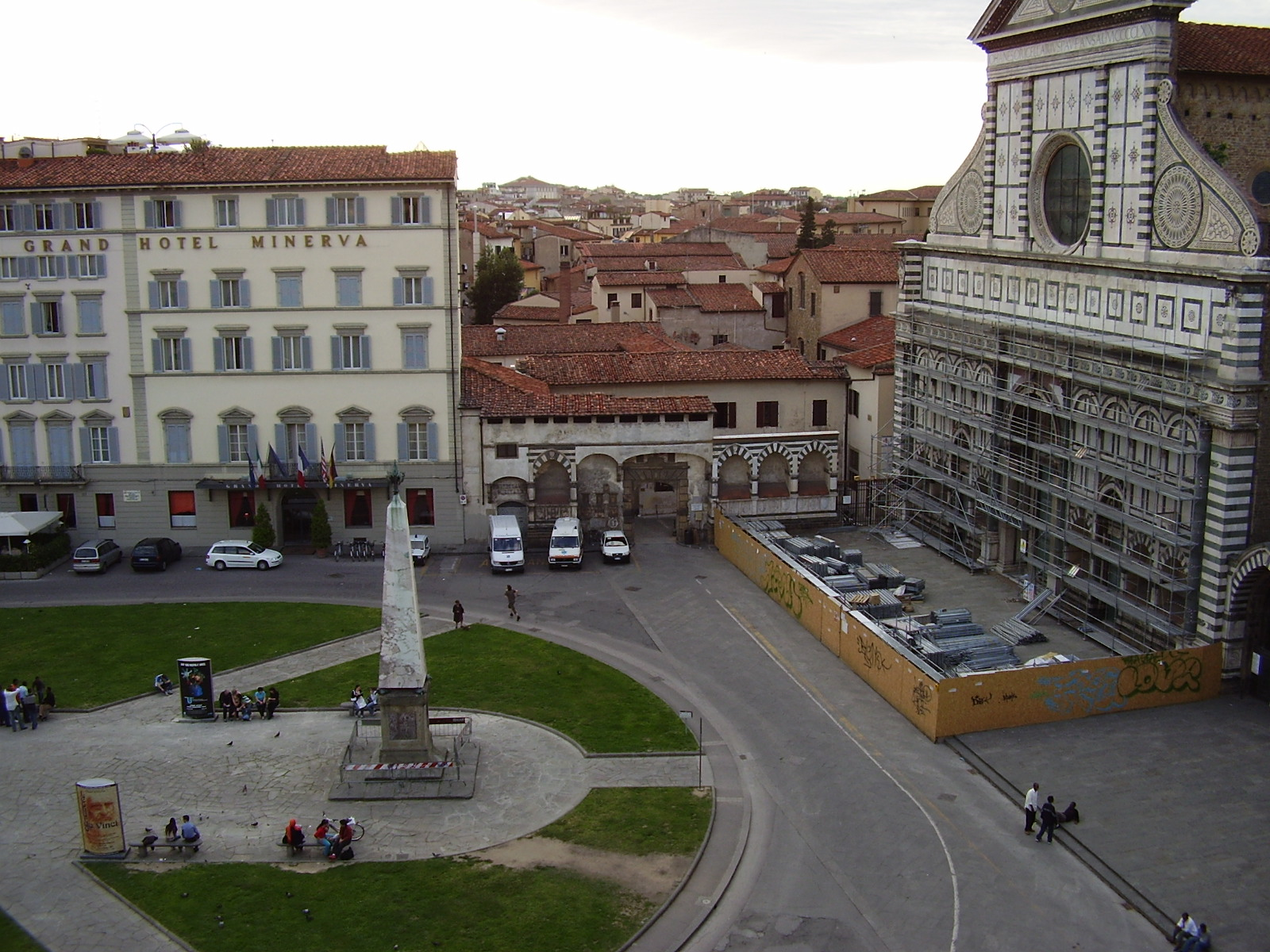
Piazza Santa Maria Novella

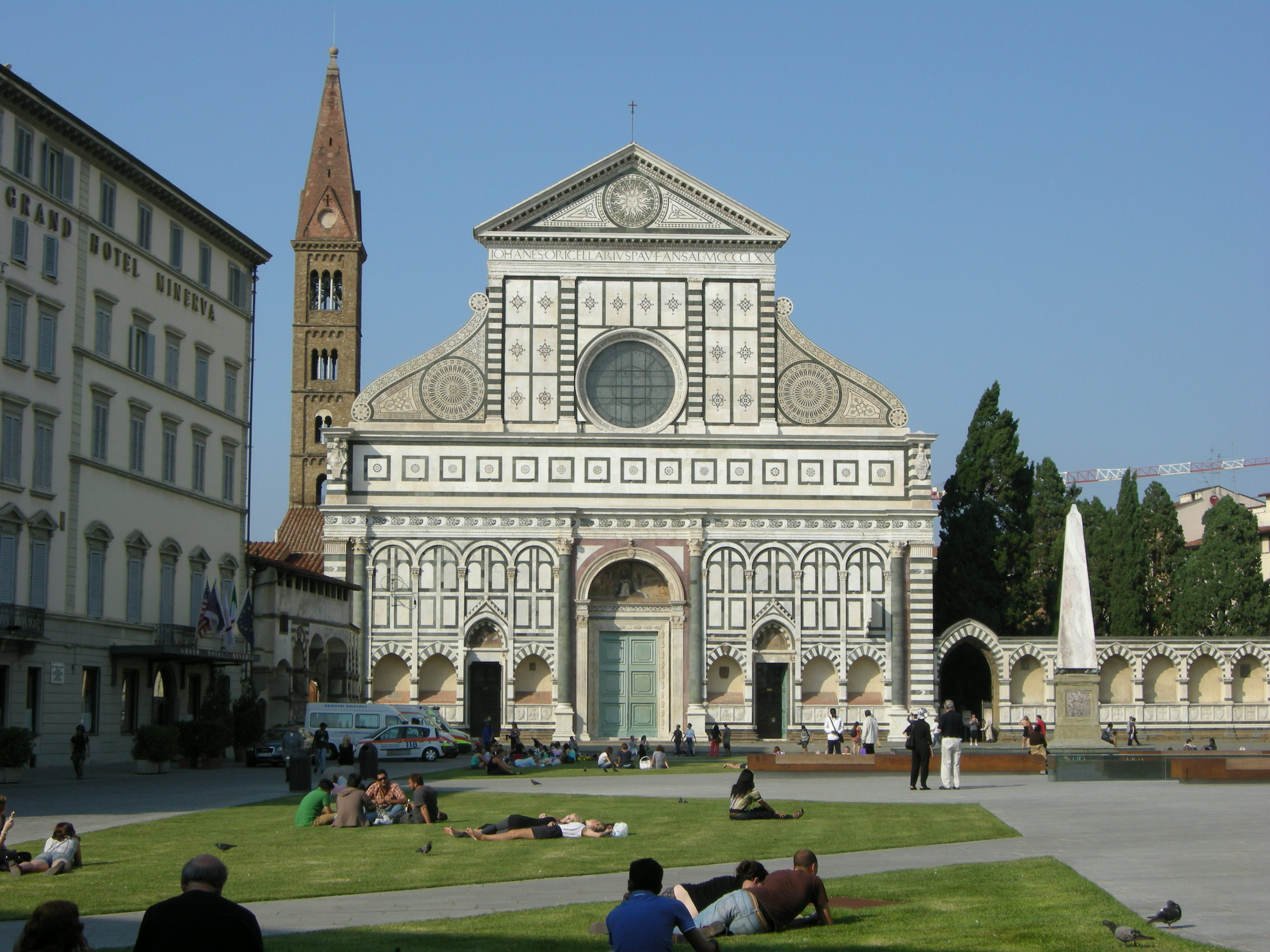
Basilica of Santa Maria Novella

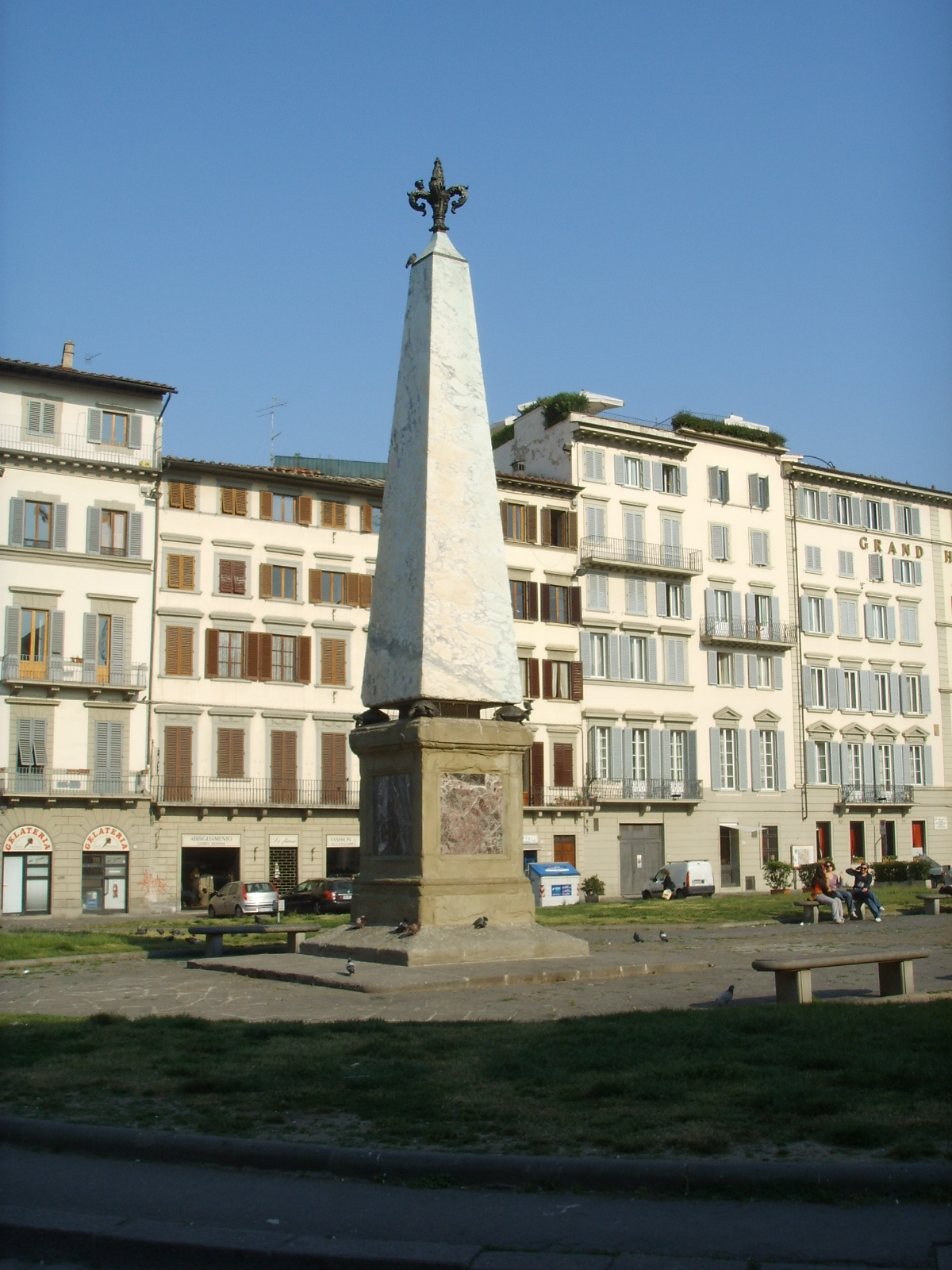
Obelisk
