= River (given name) =

- Gender: Unisex

Origin
- Origin: English
- Meaning: River

River is a given name of English origin taken from river, the English word for a naturally flowing watercourse.

It is in common use in English-speaking countries such as the United States for both males and females. It has ranked among the top 1,000 names for newborn boys in the United States since 2000 and among the top 150 most popular names for American boys since 2020. It has ranked among the top 1,000 girls for American girls since 2009 and ranked among the top 200 names given to newborn American girls since 2020. It has ranked among the top 1,000 names for newborn boys in England and Wales at different times since 1996 and among the top 150 names for boys since 2021. It has ranked among the top 1,000 names for newborn girls in England and Wales since 2011 and among the top 150 names since 2021.

== People ==
- River Alexander (born 1999), American actor
- River Allen (footballer) (born 1995), English footballer
- River Butcher (born Rhea Harriett Butcher; born 1982), American comedian
- River Cracraft (born 1994), American football player
- River Huang (born 1989), Taiwanese actor
- River Phoenix (1970–1993), American actor and musician
- River Radamus (born 1998), American alpine skier
- River Wilson-Bent (born 1994), British middleweight boxer

== Fictional characters ==
- River Song from the BBC TV show Doctor Who
- River Tam from the TV series Firefly
- River Cartwright from the TV and book series Slow Horses
