= La Rivière-de-Corps =

Commune in Grand Est, France

- Commune
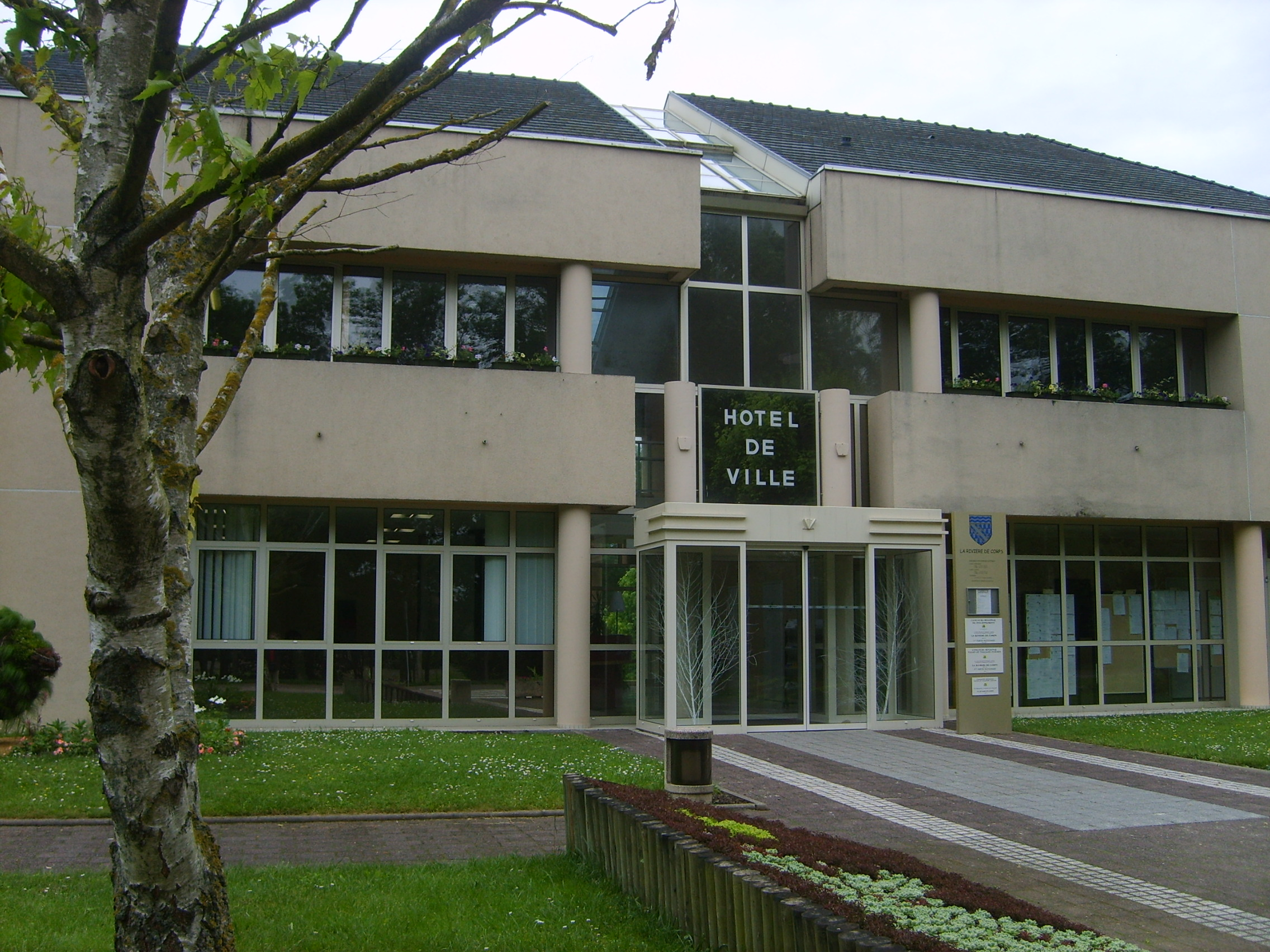
- Town hall

- Coat of arms
- Location of La Rivière-de-Corps
- Location within France Location within Grand Est
- Coordinates: 48°17′19″N 4°01′14″E
- Country: France
- Region: Grand Est
- Department: Aube
- Arrondissement: Troyes
- Canton: Saint-André-les-Vergers
- Intercommunality: CA Troyes Champagne Métropole

Government
  - Mayor (2020–2026): Christophe Chomat
- Area^{1}: 7.26 km^{2} (2.80 sq mi)
- Elevation: 115 m (377 ft)
- Highest elevation: 136 m (446 ft)
- Lowest elevation: 108 m (354 ft)
- Population (2023): 3,692
  - Density: 509/km^{2} (1,320/sq mi)
- Time zone: UTC+01:00 (CET)
  - Summer (DST): UTC+02:00 (CEST)
- INSEE/Postal code: 10321 /10440
- ^{1} French Land Register data, which excludes lakes, ponds, glaciers > 1 km^{2} (0.386 sq mi or 247 acres) and river estuaries.

La Rivière-de-Corps (French pronunciation: [la ʁivjɛʁ də kɔʁ]) is a commune in the Aube department in north-central France.

== Population ==
Historical population
Year	Pop.	±% p.a.
1968	952	—
1975	1,469	+6.39%
1982	1,830	+3.19%
1990	2,631	+4.64%
1999	2,952	+1.29%
2007	2,959	+0.03%
2012	2,969	+0.07%
2017	3,396	+2.72%
2023	3,692	+1.40%
Source: INSEE

== See also ==
- Communes of the Aube department
