= Robert Rive =

British photographer (1817–1868)

Robert Julius Rive
- Born: March 27, 1817; Wrocław, Prussia
- Died: March 30, 1868 (aged 51); Torre del Greco, Naples, Kingdom of Italy
- Other name: Roberto Rive
- Occupation: Photographer

Robert Julius Rive was a Prussian-born photographer that opened his studio in Naples around the 1850s. After several years working in this country he changed his name to Roberto Rive. Rive conducted a series of systematic photographic campaigns around Italy. The main collections of his work are the photos from Pompei and Rome in the 1860s and 1870s. After his death in 1868, his brother Julius Otto took over the studio until 1888.

== Photography ==
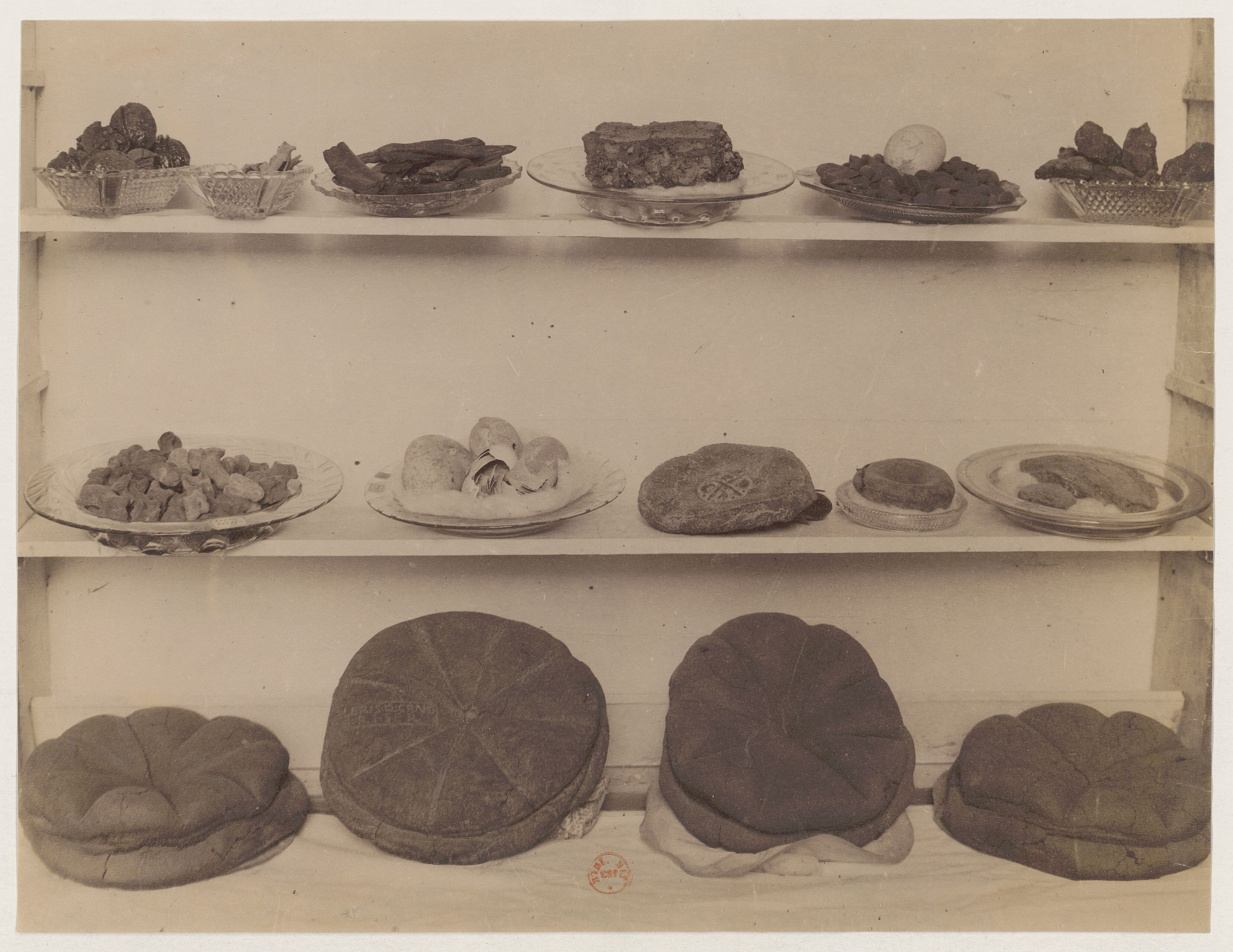
Pezzi di pane, Museo di Napoli

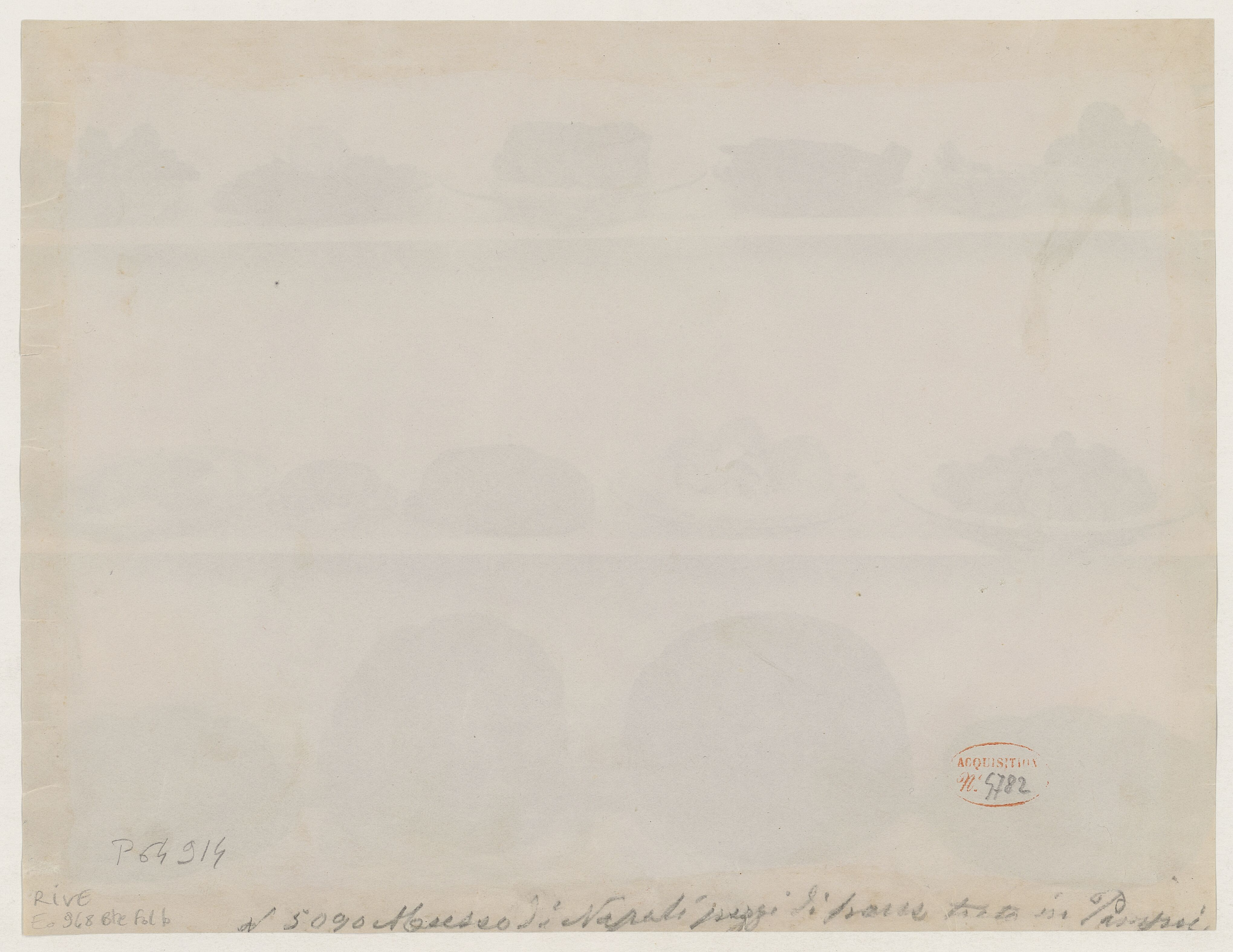
Pezzi di pane, Museo di Napoli (verso, showing signature)

Robert Rive worked as a topographical and portrait photographer from the beginning of the 1860s until 1889 in Naples. In 1867, he took part at the Exposition Universelle of Paris. His studio produced views and stereographs of many Italian cities. He took photographs of monuments of Naples, Pompei, Sorrento, Capri, Amalfi and monuments of Sicily. He also took photographs of cities such as Florence, Pisa, Siena, Rome and Genoa. He held studios in Naples, Palazzo Serracapriola, Palazzo Lieti.

"Giorgio Sommer and Robert Rive began a systematic census of the monuments and daily life, in an amazing collection that provided information on Campania and Sicily"

He also patented a photosensitive paper used in Southern Italy.

== Gallery ==
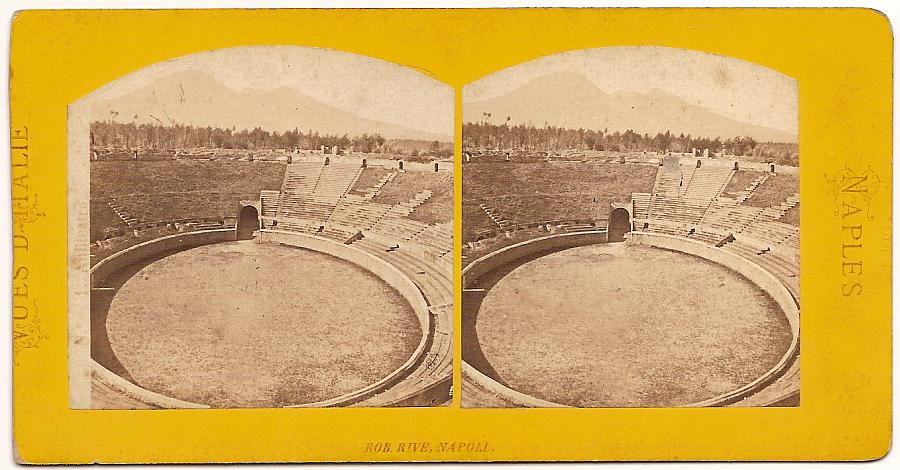
Stereo card of the Amphitheatre in Pompeii, 1865

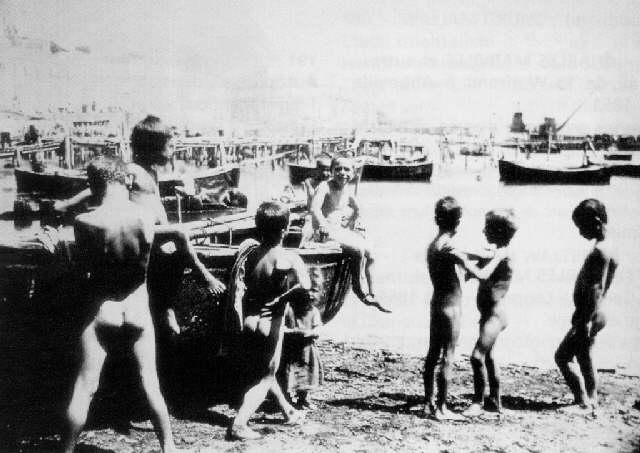
Enfants nus à Naples, 1870.

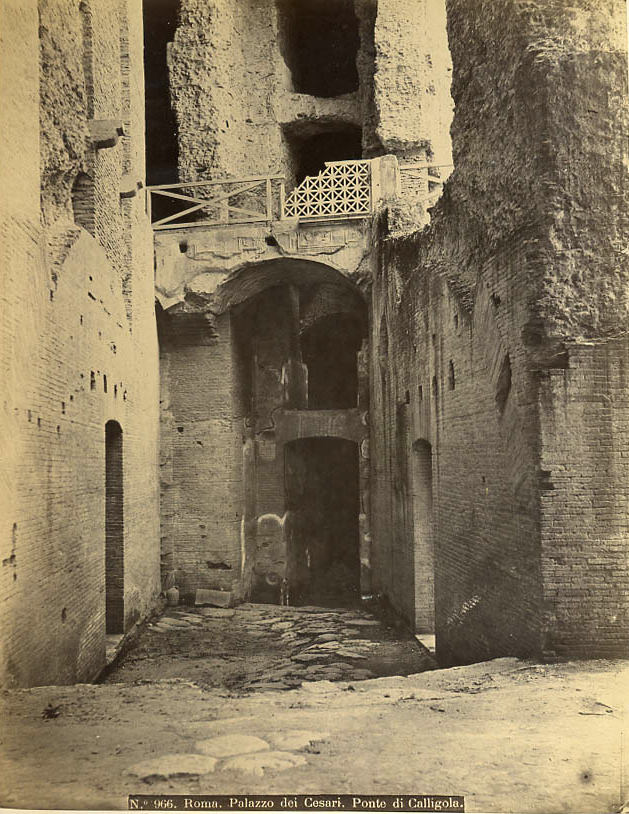
Palace of the emperors. Caligula's bridge, before 1889

== Artwork Holders ==
- J. Paul Getty Museum
- Musée d'Orsay
- Museo di Roma
