= Rios (disambiguation) =

Rios is a Spanish, Portuguese, and Galician surname.

Rios may also refer to:

- Rios, Texas, an unincorporated community in Duval County, Texas, U.S.
- Riós, a municipality in of Ourense province, Galicia, Spain

== See also ==
- Rio (disambiguation), (Rio is the singular form of Ríos "rivers")
- Del Rio (disambiguation)
- Rivière (disambiguation)
- Rive (disambiguation)
- Rivers (disambiguation)
- River (disambiguation)
- Los Rios (disambiguation)
