= Fratelli Alinari =

Italian photographic studio and publisher

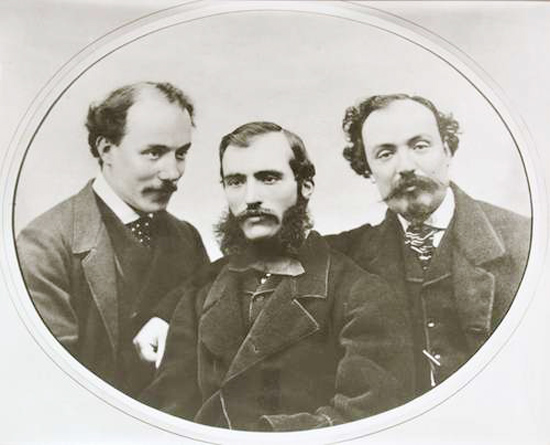
Fratelli Alinari

Fratelli Alinari is one of the world's oldest photographic firms, founded in Florence, Italy in 1852. Its archives contain 5.5 million photographs, ranging from daguerreotypes to modern digital photos from around the world.

== Founding ==
In 1852, Leopoldo Alinari founded a photographic studio. His brothers Giuseppe and Romualdo joined him two years later to establish Fratelli Alinari Fotografi Editori, a photographic workshop dedicated initially to the documentation of notable Italian paintings, sculptures, monuments and architecture. They subsequently expanded the scope of their photographic project to include the towns and landscapes of Italy, as well as portrait photography and images of national costume. The brothers achieved recognition for the quality of their work, and by 1860 their portrait subjects included the Italian royal family.

The three brothers shared the work of running the studio, Romualdo the eldest (1830–1891) ran the administrative aspects of the studio; Leonardo (1832–1865), the middle brother was responsible for business organization including cultural policy; the youngest brother, Giuseppe (1836-1890) was the technical expert. The main subjects of their photographs were architecture, monuments and works of art. They also ran the Alinari publishing house in Italy.

== Work ==
The studio used the collodion process to produce their negatives. In 1856, the studio produced their first catalogue in print, Collection des Vues Monumentales de la Toscane en Photographie par les Frères Alinari, with a text in French. It included photographic panoramas of Tuscany and its monuments, most particularly those in Arezzo, Florence, Siena and Pisa. In 1855, a selection of these images were shown in the Exposition Universelle, Paris, which firmly established them as important European photographers. The following year, they won a gold medal for an exhibition in Brussels. They continued to exhibit their work throughout Europe, including shows in Vienna, Paris, and Milan.

== Today ==
Alinari is today the oldest company in the world in the field of photography. Alinari holds a photographic corpus, which includes over 5,500,000 pictures of its own, historical and contemporary, ranging from vintage prints, glass plate negatives to film and fotocolors.

In 2007, the company opened the Museum of Multimedia and History of Photography (MNAF) is open to the public in Florence, Italy.

In order to make the images available to a greater number of persons, Alinari has established an on-line search system of its photographic archives, employing a system of iconographic classification produced in collaboration with the University of Florence with over 330,000 images. 400 new images are added on-line daily. The digitization process is done using a Kodak EverSmart Supreme flatbed scanner and a Leaf/Mamiya 80 megapixels Aptus II 12 80 digital camera back. Color correction is done using Eizo monitors through a fully calibrated system. Color profiling is done using Adobe '98 color space.

== Archives ==
The brothers' archives along with the works of other photographers are held in the Fondazione per la Fotografia. In 2019, the archive of the Alinari brothers was purchased by the Region of Tuscany, who currently manages the Alinari Foundation collection.

== Collections ==
Over 500 photographic prints by the Alinari Brothers are held in the Museum of Fine Arts, Houston. Several portraits by the Fratelli Alinari are held in the collection of the National Portrait Gallery, London. The Department of Image Collections at the National Gallery of Art Library holds an almost complete copy of the Alinari photographic archive representing works of art and architecture.

== Gallery ==
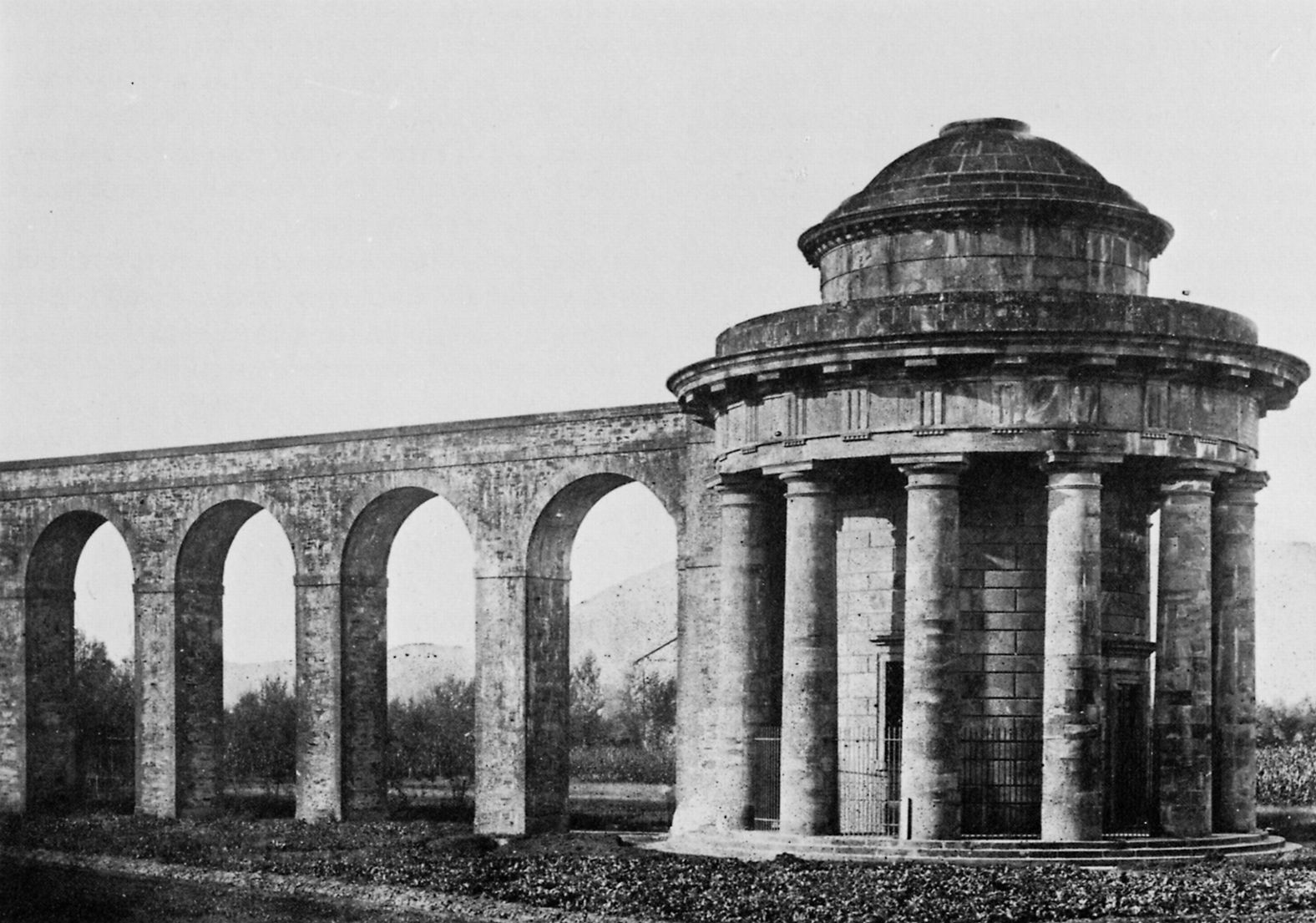
The Aqueduct in Lucca, between 1876 and 1881

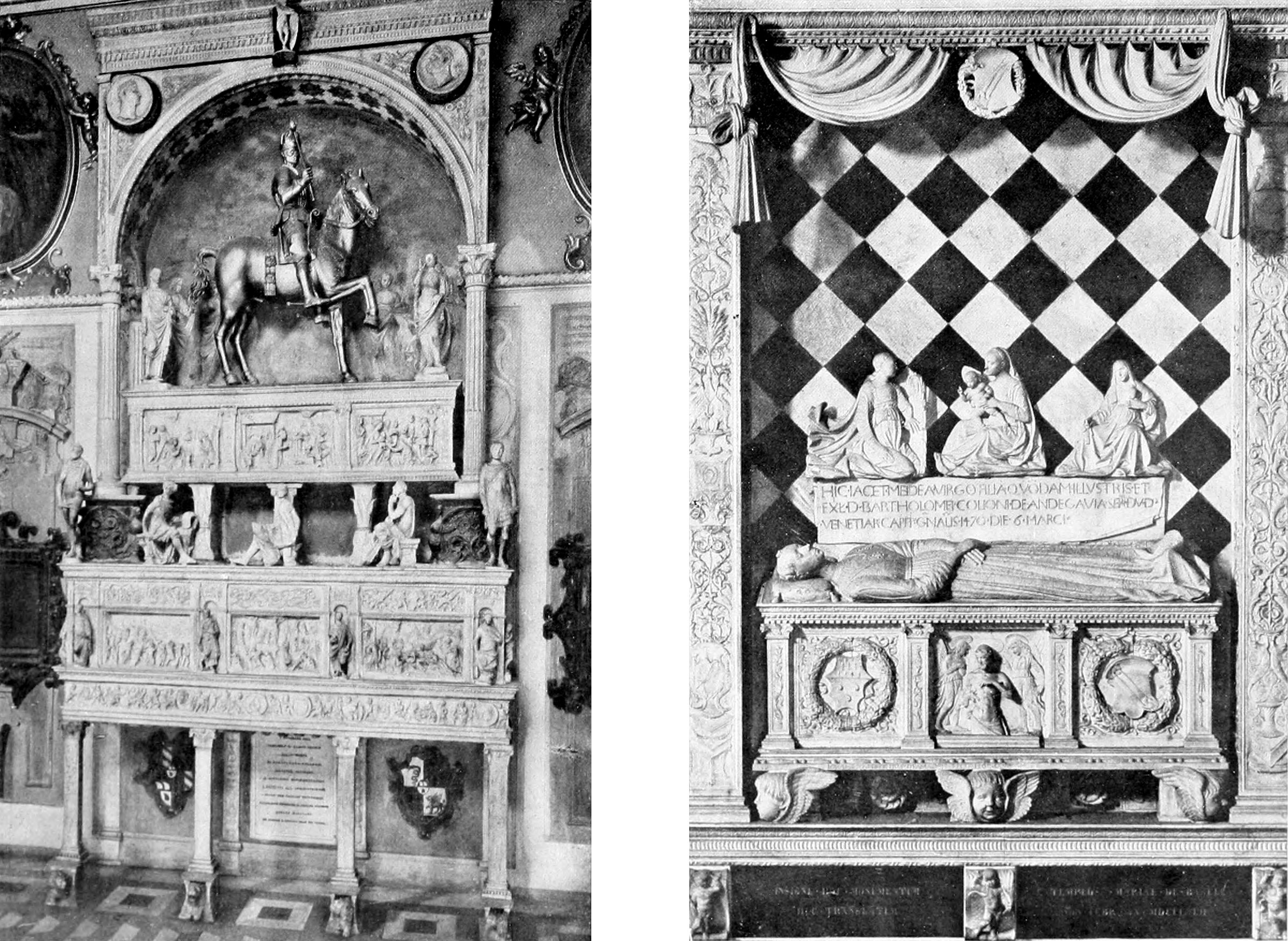
I Monumenti Italiani e la Guerra di Ugo Ojetti, Milano, before 1917

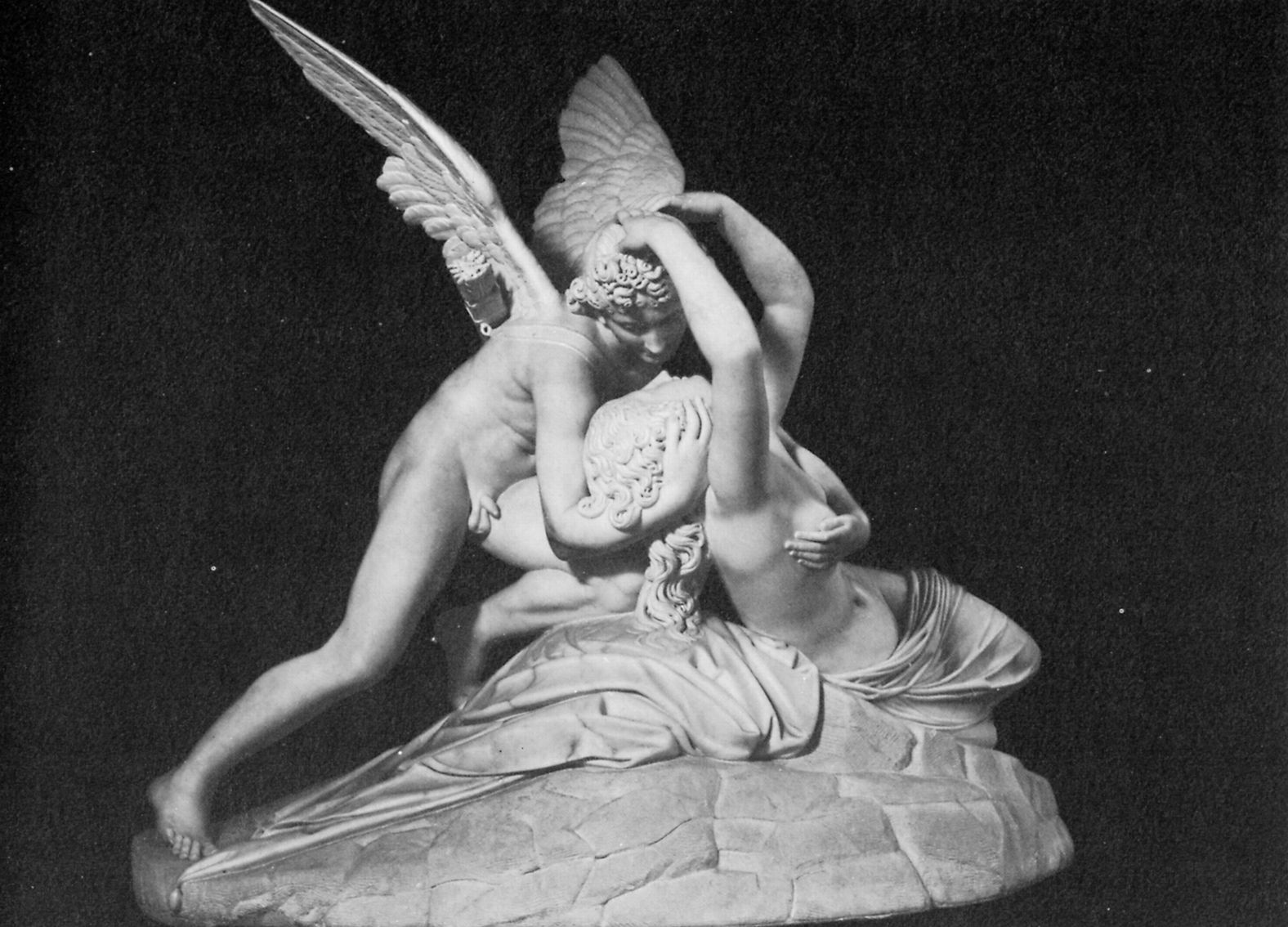
Photograph of Canova sculpture, Cupid and Psyche, between 1899 and 1913
