= Hornemann =

Hornemann or Horneman may refer to:

- C. F. E. Horneman (Christian Frederik Emil, 1840–1906), Danish composer, grandson of Christian Horneman
- Christian Horneman (1765–1844), Danish painter
- Christian Hersleb Horneman (1781–1860), Norwegian jurist
- Ebbe Carsten Hornemann (1784–1851), Norwegian politician
- Emil Horneman (1809–1870), (=Johan Ole Emil Horneman), Danish composer, son of Christian Horneman
- Friedrich Hornemann (1772–1801), German explorer in Africa
- Jens Wilken Hornemann (1770–1841), Danish botanist
