= Horneman =

Horneman is a surname. Notable people with the surname include:

- C. F. E. Horneman (1840–1906), Danish composer, conductor, music publisher, and music instructor
- Charly Nouck Horneman (born 2004), Danish footballer
- Christian Horneman (1765–1844), Danish painter
- Christian Hersleb Horneman (1781–1860), Norwegian jurist and elected official
- Emil Horneman (1809–1870), Danish composer
