= Ebbe =

- Gender: Male
- Language: Danish, Swedish
- Name day: 6 March (Sweden)

Origin
- Region of origin: Denmark, Sweden

Other names
- Related names: Æbbe, Ebba

Ebbe is a Scandinavian masculine given name. The feminine version is Ebba. It is now mainly found in Denmark and Sweden and may refer to:

- Ebbe Carlsson (1947–1992), Swedish journalist and publisher
- Ebbe Frick, Swedish sprint canoer
- Ebbe Gilbe (1940–2008), Swedish documentary filmmaker and director
- Ebbe Grims-land (1915–2015), Swedish composer, viola and mandolin player
- Ebbe Gyllenstierna (1911–2003), Swedish Army officer and modern pentathlete
- Ebbe Hamerik (1898–1951), Danish composer
- Ebbe Hertzberg (1847–1912), Norwegian professor, social economist and legal historian
- Ebbe Hoff (1906–1985), American physiologist
- Ebbe Carsten Hornemann (1784–1851), Norwegian politician
- Ebbe Kornerup (1874–1957), Danish painter and writer
- Ebbe Langberg (1933–1989), Danish actor and film director
- Ebbe Lieberath (1871–1937), Swedish military officer, writer and pioneer of Swedish Scouting
- Ebbe Nielsen (1950–2001), Danish entomologist
- Ebbe Parsner (1922–2013), Danish rower
- Ebbe Rode (1910–1998), Danish actor
- Ebbe Roe Smith (born 1949), American actor and screenwriter
- Ebbe Rørdam (1925–1945), member of the Danish resistance during WWII
- Ebbe Sand (born 1972), Danish footballer
- Ebbe Schön (1929–2022), Swedish author, folklorist and associate professor in literature
- Ebbe Schwartz (1901–1964), Danish football administrator
- Ebbe Siönäs (born 1995), Swedish ice hockey goaltender
- Ebbe Skovdahl (1945–2020), Danish football coach and manager
- Ebbe Ulfeldt (c. 1600–c. 1670), Danish landscape painter
- Ebbe Wallén (1917–2009), Swedish bobsledder

Ebbe is also a surname:

- Annelise Ebbe (1950–2020), Danish peace activist and translator
- Dean Ebbe (born 1994), Irish footballer

== See also ==
- Ebby
- Ebb (disambiguation)
