= Ebb Tide =

Ebb Tide or ebbtide may refer to:

- Ebb tide, the period between high tide and low tide when the sea level falls

== Films and television ==
- Ebb Tide (1922 film), an American silent adventure film
- Ebb Tide (1932 film), a British drama film
- Ebb Tide (1937 film), an American Technicolor adventure film
- "Ebb Tide" (The Wire), an episode of the TV series
- "Ebb Tide" (Penny Dreadful), an episode of the TV series
- Ebbtide, a 1994 Australian film

== Music ==
- "Ebb Tide" (song), a 1953 song written by Carl Sigman and Robert Maxwell
- Gettin' Up, also released as Ebb Tide, a 1967 album by Johnny "Hammond" Smith
- Nino and the Ebb Tides, or The Ebb Tides, an American doo-wop group

== Other uses ==
- Ebb Tide (ship), a 1956 American vessel
- The Ebb-Tide, an 1894 short novel by Robert Louis Stevenson

== See also ==
- Ebb (disambiguation)
- Tide (disambiguation)
- Ebb and flow (disambiguation)
- Ebbing (disambiguation)
