= Rising Tide =

Rising Tide(s) or The Rising Tide may refer to:

- "A rising tide lifts all boats", an aphorism

== Organizations ==
- Rising Tide North America, a network of groups and individuals organizing action against the root causes of climate change
- Rising Tide UK, part of the International Rising Tide Network
- Rising Tide Australia, the Australian contingent of the Rising Tide Network

== Film ==
- The Rising Tide (film), a 1949 Canadian short documentary film
- The Rising Tide, a 2009 film narrated by Rosalind Chao
- A Rising Tide, a 2015 American romantic drama film

== Literature ==
- Rising Tide (Forgotten Realms novel), a 1999 novel by Mel Odom
- Rising Tide (Thesman novel), a 2003 young-adult novel by Jean Thesman
- The Rising Tide (Deland novel), a 1916 novel by Margaret Deland
- The Rising Tide (Shaara novel), a 2006 novel by Jeff Shaara
- Rising Tides, a 2011 novel in the Destroyermen series by Taylor Anderson

== Music ==
- Rising Tide Records, an American record label
- Rising Tide (Chesapeake album), 1994
- The Rising Tide (Sunny Day Real Estate album), 2000
- "The Rising Tide", a 2012 song by The Killers from the album Battle Born

== Other uses ==
- Rising Tide Studios, an American media company
- "Rising Tide" Haida Title Lands Agreement
- Civilization: Beyond Earth – Rising Tide, a 2015 video game expansion pack
- Enigma: Rising Tide, a video game
- Ebb tide, the period between high tide and low tide, so the period during which the sea level falls

== See also ==
- Tide (disambiguation)
- High tide (disambiguation)
- The River is Rising (disambiguation)
- The Rising Tied, a 2005 album by Fort Minor
- Vancouver Island Rising Tide, a Canadian rugby union team
