= Ebb =

Ebb, EBB or Ebbs may refer to:

== People ==
E.B.B.

- Elizabeth Barrett Browning (1806–1861), English poet

Ebb

- Ebb Cade (1890–1953), American construction worker and medical test subject
- Ebb Caraway (1905–1975), U.S. baseball player and American football player
- Ebb Rose (1925–2007), American racecar driver
- J. Ebb Duncan (1909–1980), American politician
- Fred Ebb (1928–2004), American lyricist
- Karl Ebb (1896–1988), Finnish athlete and racing driver
- Ken Ebb, Australian rugby league footballer
- Kimberley Ebb (born 1987), Australian rules footballer
- Martin Ebb (born 1965), Australian rugby league footballer
- Milou Ebb (1934–2009), French Polynesian politician

Ebbs

- Anne Ebbs (née Sinnott; 1940–2024), Irish Paralympic table tennis medallist
- John Charles Ebbs, Canadian politician

== Places ==
- Al Ebb (Arabic: العب), Al Daayen, Qatar
- Ebbs, Tyrol, Austria
- Ebbw Vale Town railway station (station code EBB), Ebbw Vale, Blaenau Gwent, Wales
- Entebbe International Airport (IATA airport code EBB), Entebbe, Uganda
- École Belge Burundi, a Belgian international school in Bujumbura, Burundi
- HMS John Ebbs, a WW2 warship

== Other uses ==
- Ebb (spacecraft), one of the spacecraft of the Gravity Recovery and Interior Laboratory
- Ebb tide
- Emergency Broadband Benefit
- European Brain and Behaviour Society (EBBS)

== See also ==
- Ebbs Shore, Ontario, Canada
- Ebbe
- Ebby
- Ebb and flow (disambiguation)
- Ebb Tide (disambiguation)
- Ebbing (disambiguation)
