= Tidal wave =

Tidal wave may refer to:

== Seas and oceans ==
- A tidal bore, which is a large movement of water formed by the funnelling of the incoming tide into a river or narrow bay
- A storm surge, or tidal surge, which can cause waves that breach flood defences
- A tsunami, a series of water waves in a body of water caused by the displacement of a large volume of water, although this usage of "tidal wave" is a misnomer and is disfavored by the scientific community.
  - A megatsunami, which is an informal term to describe a tsunami that has initial wave heights that are much larger than normal tsunamis
- The crest (physics) of a tide as it moves around the Earth

== Film ==
- The Tidal Wave, a 1920 British silent film
- Tidal Wave (1973 film), a film based on novel Japan Sinks
- Tidal Wave (2009 film), a South Korean disaster movie
- Portrait of Jennie (1948), rereleased with the title Tidal Wave

== Amusements ==
- Tidal Wave (Thorpe Park), the theme park ride at Thorpe Park, in the United Kingdom
- Tidal Wave (Transformers), a Decepticon in the Transformers universe

== Music ==
- The Tidal Waves, a 1960s American garage rock band

=== Albums ===
- Tidal Wave (Taking Back Sunday album) or the title song, 2016
- Tidal Wave (Young Liars album) or the title song, 2014
- Tidal Wave (EP), by the Apples in Stereo (recording as the Apples), or the title song, 1993
- Tidal Wave (Samishii Nettaigyo), by the Nolans, 1991
- Tidal Wave!, by the Challengers, 1995
- Tidal Wave, by Frankie Paul, 1985

=== Songs ===
- "Tidal Wave" (song), by Sub Focus, 2012
- "Tidal Wave", by Bomb the Bass from Clear, 1995
- "Tidal Wave", by Chase Atlantic, 2018
- "Tidal Wave", by Got7 from Winter Heptagon, 2025
- "Tidal Wave", by Husky from Forever So, 2011
- "Tidal Wave", by Interpol from El Pintor, 2014
- "Tidal Wave", by John Foxx from Metamatic, 1980
- "Tidal Wave", by JP Cooper from Raised Under Grey Skies, 2017
- "Tidal Wave", by Karmin from Pulses, 2014
- "Tidal Wave", by the Killers from the B-side of the single "Spaceman", 2008
- "Tidal Wave", by Nickelback from Get Rollin', 2022
- "Tidal Wave", by Owl City from Ocean Eyes, 2009
- "Tidal Wave", by the Ozark Mountain Daredevils from It'll Shine When It Shines, 1974
- "Tidal Wave", by Portugal. The Man from Woodstock, 2017
- "Tidal Wave", by Ronnie Laws from Pressure Sensitive, 1975
- "Tidal Wave", by Skye Sweetnam from Noise from the Basement, 2004
- "Tidal Wave", by Smash, 1995
- "Tidal Wave", by the Sugarcubes from Here Today, Tomorrow Next Week!, 1989
- "Tidal Wave", by Thee Oh Sees, 2009
- "Tidal Wave", by the Upsetters from The Upsetter, 1969
- "The Tidal Wave", by Gorky's Zygotic Mynci from Gorky 5, 1998
- "Tidal Waves", by All Time Low from Future Hearts, 2015

== Other uses ==
- Operation Tidal Wave, a 1943 World War II military operation
- Tidalwave Microtech, defunct Taiwanese manufacturer of palmtop PCs

== See also ==
- A rogue wave of up to 100 feet high, often in the middle of the ocean and against prevailing current and wave direction
- Jwar Bhata (disambiguation) (lit. 'Tidal Wave'), various Indian films so titled
