= Ebba (disambiguation) =

Ebba is a feminine given name.

Ebba may also refer to :

Places

- the modern Arabic name of the probable site of ancient Numidian Obba, Roman bishopric and now a Catholic titular see
- Ebba, Lebanon, a village of Lebanon

Other

- Ebba Grön, Swedish punk band also known as Ebba

== See also ==
- EBBA (European Border Breakers Award)
- Æbbe (disambiguation)
