= Ebbing (disambiguation) =

Ebbing is a stage of tides.

It may also refer to:

- Ebbing, a song by Swans
- Ebbing, Missouri, a fictional town

== See also ==
- Ebb (disambiguation)
- Ebb and flow (disambiguation)
- Ebb Tide (disambiguation)
- Ebbing Air National Guard Base
- Ebbing and Flowing Spring
