= Singer (novel) =

2005 novel by Jean Thesman

- First edition (publ. Viking Juvenile)
- Author: Jean Thesman
- Language: English
- Publication date: 2005

Singer (2005) is a young-adult fantasy novel by Jean Thesman, based loosely on the Irish legend of the Children of Lir, but having more in common with Thesman's earlier novel The Other Ones, about a young girl coming to terms with her magical powers.

== Plot summary ==
Gwenore for years has been punished and imprisoned by her evil witch mother Rhiamon, but she finally escapes with the aid of her slave-servant Brennan, her friend Tom, and a mysterious and seemingly apostate priest Caddaric. She first takes sanctuary at an abbey, then at an alternative home of gifted women. Along the way, she learns about her natural and her magical gifts in the arts and in healing, as the women become her teachers; from Father Caddaric she finally learns of the spellbound destiny he created for her to combat her wicked mother. She escapes to the kingdom of Lir, where she is made slave-governess of the four children who are to be transformed to swans before Gwenore's ultimate showdown with her mother.
