= Ebb and flow =

Ebb and flow may refer to:

- The movement of tides
- Ebb and flow hydroponics, an agricultural technique
- A pair of satellites launched by GRAIL
- A song on Pink Floyd's album The Endless River
- Ebb & Flow, a song by the fictional pop duo Off the Hook

== See also ==
- Ebb and Flo, British TV show
- Ebb (disambiguation)
- Ebb Tide (disambiguation)
- Ebbing (disambiguation)
- Jwar Bhata (disambiguation)
