= Christian Horneman =

Danish painter (1765–1844)

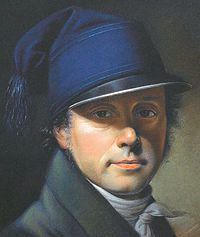
Self-portrait (1815)

Christian Horneman (15 August 1765 – 7 March 1844) was a Danish miniature and pastels painter, mainly known for portraits. He was the father of the composer Emil Horneman and grandfather of C. F. E. Horneman, also a composer.

== Biography ==
Horneman was born on 15 August 1765 in Copenhagen. He attended the Royal Danish Academy of Fine Arts from 1780, winning its small silver medal in 1785, and its large silver medal in 1786. In 1787 he went abroad to further his studies and it would take sixteen years before he returned to Denmark. He specialized in portrait miniatures. He experienced the outbreak of the French Revolution first hand in Paris in 1789. He also visited Italy and Vienna, where Johann Heinrich Wilhelm Tischbein and Heinrich Füger were among the artists who inspired him. In Berlin he learned a new technique, most likely from Daniel Chodowiecki, which he often used in his later work.

In 1803 Horneman returned to Denmark, and the following year he was appointed miniature painter to the Royal Danish Court. In 1805 he became a member of the Academy, and in 1816 he was given free residency at Charlottenborg. He was made a professor in 1835.

In his later years he suffered from poor health, and from 1840 onward he received an annual pension. He is buried at Garnisons Cemetery in Copenhagen.

== Works ==
While abroad he had the opportunity to make portraits of a few of the leading figures of his day, including Ludwig van Beethoven (1802) and Joseph Haydn, while he made sketches of several others in a sketch book now kept at the Danish National Gallery. The portrait of Beethoven was painted in 1803 as a miniature. Beethoven was very fond of the result, possibly because he is very good looking in it compared to later representations, and sent it to Stephan von Breuning, a school friend, in the hopes of reconciliation one year after the portrait was completed.

After his return to Denmark he was one among several portrait painters who filled the void after the death of Cornelius Høyer and Jens Juel. He made miniatures and particularly pastels which was the technique in which he did his best works. In the 1820s he also turned to lithography.

== Gallery ==
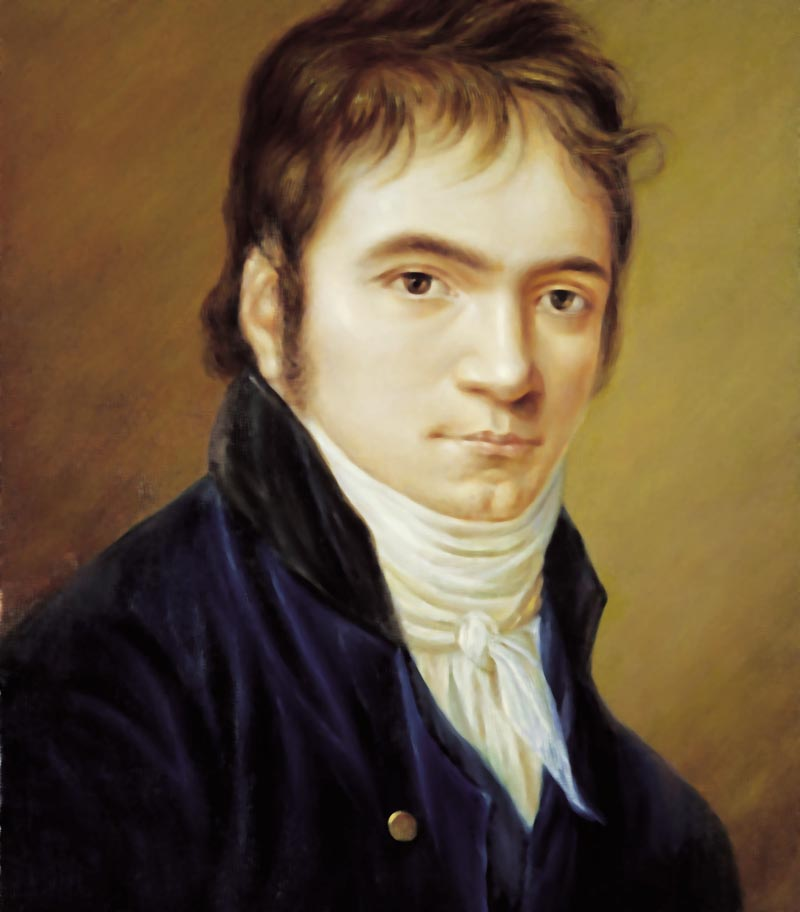
Portrait of Ludwig van Beethoven, 1803

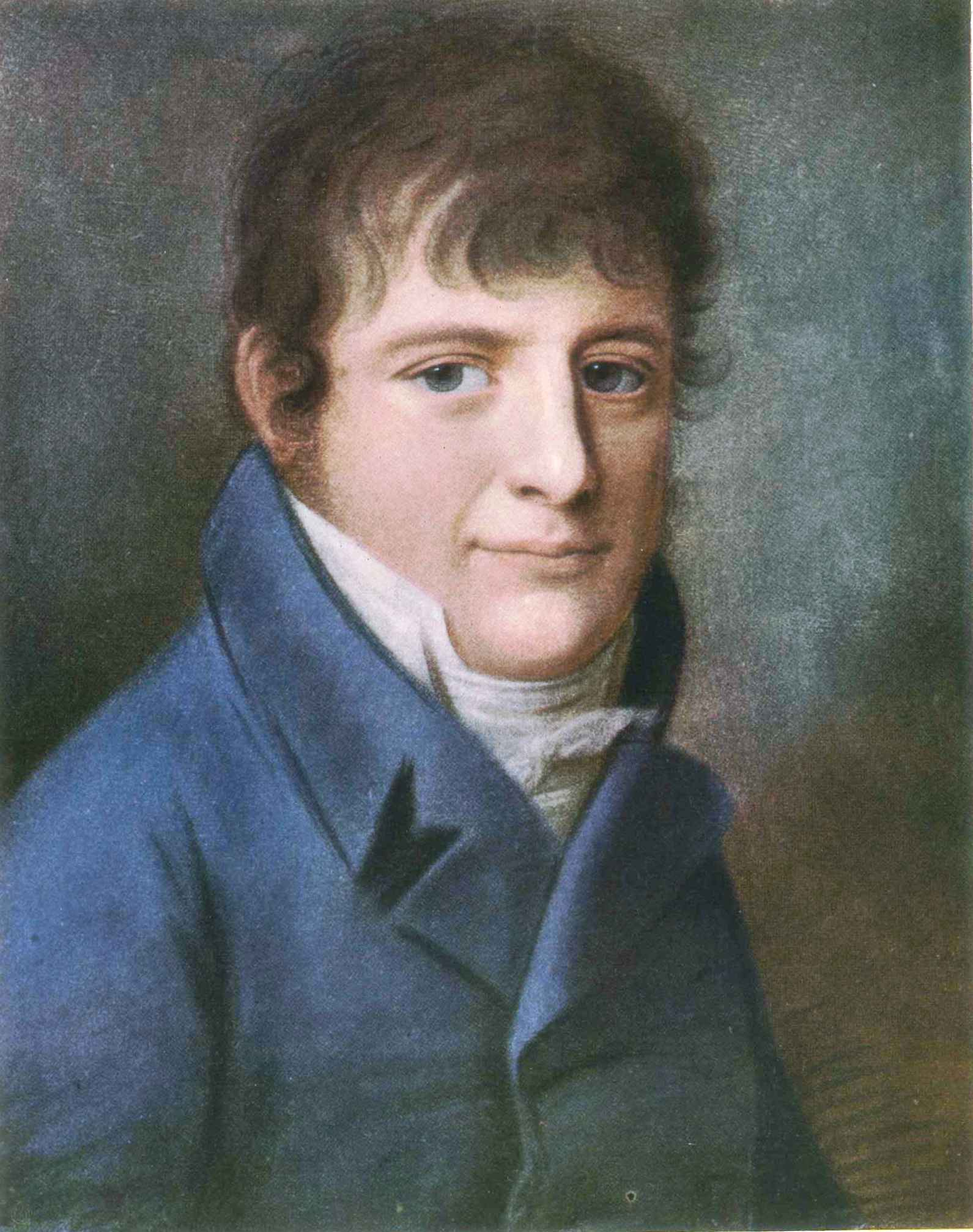
Portrait of Herman Wedel Jarlsberg, 1805

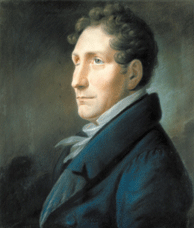
Pastel of Friedrich Kuhlau, 1828

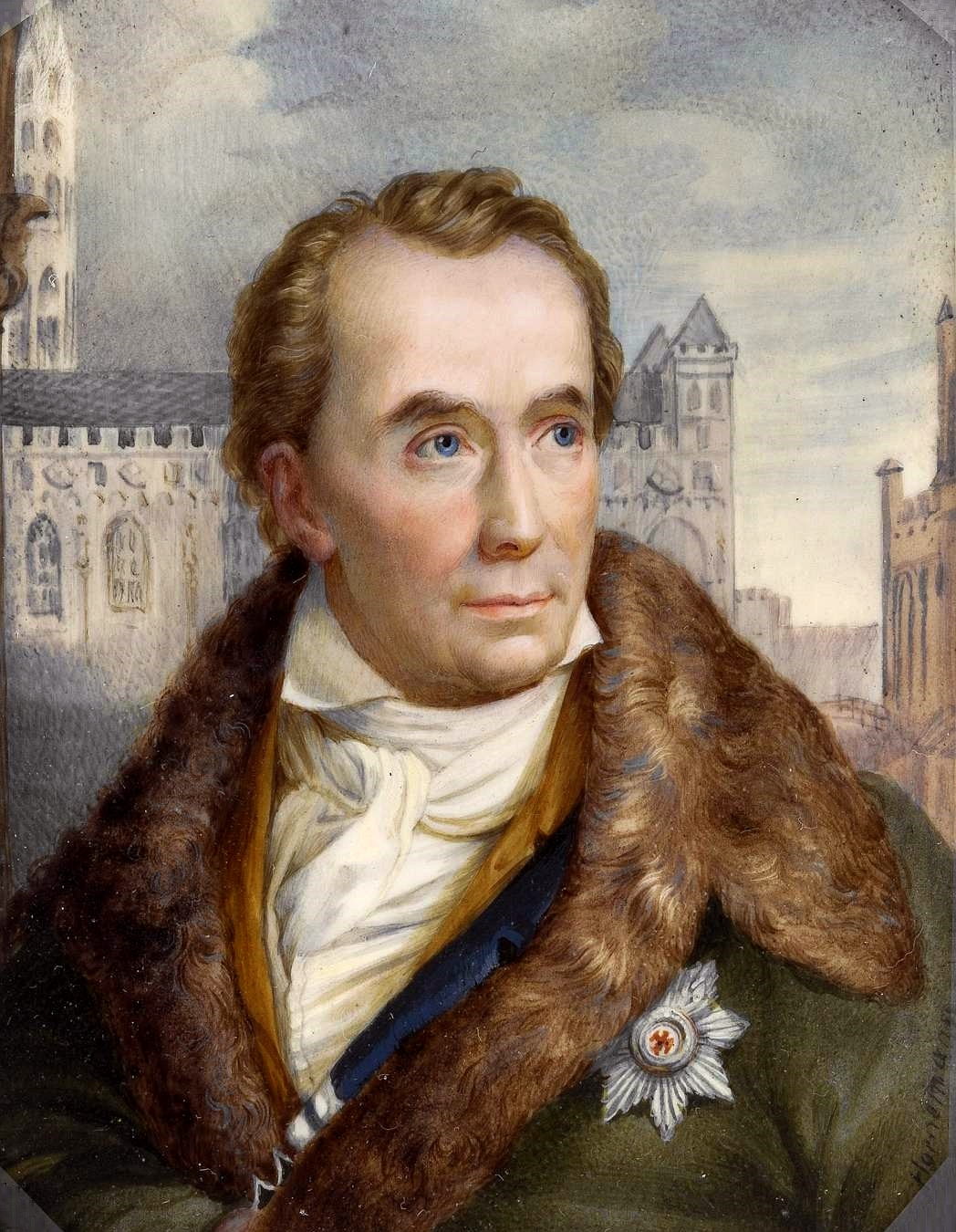
Portrait of Mayor von Schon, 1840

== See also ==
- Danish art
- List of Danish painters
