= A Sea So Far =

2001 novel by Jean Thesman

- First edition
- Author: Jean Thesman
- Language: English
- Genre: Young adult historical novel
- Publisher: Viking Juvenile
- Publication date: October 1, 2001
- Publication place: United States
- Media type: Print (hardback)
- Pages: 195 pp
- ISBN: 0-670-89278-5
- OCLC: 45890358
- LC Class: PZ7.T3525 Se 2001
- Followed by: Rising Tide

A Sea So Far (2001) is a historical young-adult novel by Jean Thesman. Its sequel is Rising Tide (2003).

== Plot ==
After the devastating San Francisco earthquake of 1906, two girls' lives become connected. Kate Keely is the orphaned daughter of a newspaper reporter father and an Irish immigrant mother, living close to poverty with an aunt until their home was destroyed by the earthquake. They move to a boardinghouse the aunt purchases with a friend, and there Kate learns of an opportunity to go to work as the companion to Jolie Logan. Jolie's father is a wealthy physician and her mother died in the earthquake. Suffering from a history of scarlet fever and the loss of her mother, Jolie is sickly and depressed and her father thinks a companion would lift her spirits and that together they could travel. Kate sees this position as an easy source of income and, more importantly, a chance to visit her mother's fabled Ireland. Together the girls do travel across country and then to Ireland, and become more than friends, and learn more of life than they expected.

== Reception ==
Kirkus Reviews called A Sea So Far "an enjoyable read", though noted it is "not in the league with Thesman’s strongest works, such as Rachel Chance (o.p.) and The Rain Catchers (1991)".

According to Publishers Weekly, the novel "starts out strong but later falters". They explain, "Thesman effectively weaves together [...] separate strands, [...] but as the novel progresses, the relationship seems a bit melodramatic and does not demonstrate the intimacy that the narrative claims. Unfortunately, in the end, both the plotting and character development come to seem implausible."
