= When the Road Ends =

1992 book by Jean Thesman

- First edition cover art
- Author: Jean Thesman
- Language: English
- Subject: young adult literature
- Published: Boston MA: Houghton Mifflin, 1992
- Media type: Book
- Pages: 184
- ISBN: 9780395595077
- OCLC: 23693602

When the Road Ends (1992) is a young-adult novel by Jean Thesman.

== Plot introduction ==
Twelve-year-old Mary Jack is in the foster home of a conscientious but clueless Episcopal priest, Father Matt, and his selfish troubled wife Jill. Also in their care is the silent Jane, a seven-year-old girl who had been abused. The house becomes further troubled by the introduction of an Adam, age 14; but when Matt's injured sister comes to live with them, Jill threatens to leave. In order to save his marriage, Matt sends the children and his sister to live in a cabin in the mountains, supposedly with the help of a mean housekeeper who abandons them. They are forced to work together and become a family, with Mary Jack becoming the reluctant "adult" while still trying to reclaim her own childhood.
