= Martin Ebb =

Australian rugby league footballer

Personal information
- Full name: Martin Ebb
- Born: 3 March 1965 (age 60); Sydney, New South Wales, Australia

Playing information
- Position: Wing, Fullback
Club
Years	Team	Pld	T	G	FG	P
1988	Canterbury Bulldogs	1	0	0	0	0
1989–91	Illawarra Steelers	32	9	0	0	36
	Total	33	9	0	0	36

Martin Ebb (born 3 March 1965) is an Australian former professional rugby league footballer who played during the 1980s and 1990s. He played for the Canterbury-Bankstown Bulldogs and the Illawarra Steelers. He played primarily at fullback but occasionally played on the wing. He is the brother of former Cronulla-Sutherland Sharks player Ken Ebb.

== Playing career ==
Ebb was an Engadine Dragons junior. In 1987, Ebb joined the Canterbury-Bankstown club. He made his first grade debut in his side's 22−18 victory over Cronulla-Sutherland at Belmore Sports Ground in round 2 of the 1988 season. This would be his only first grade appearance at the Bulldogs, as a result, he was subsequently left out of the Bulldogs' premiership winning grand final side of 1988.

In 1989, Ebb joined the Illawarra Steelers, the club finished last in his first season at the Steelers, winning only two games all year. 1990 was Ebb's best season of first grade. In 1990, the Steelers improved on the field with Ebb finishing second to David Moon as the top try scorer with six tries from his 16 appearances. Ebb played his final game of first grade in his side's 44−4 victory over Canterbury-Bankstown at WIN Stadium in round 3 of the 1991 season, and retired at season's end, one year before Illawarra were to go within one game of reaching what would have been their first grand final. In total, Ebb played 33 first grade games and scored nine tries.
