= Adventure Island (film) =

- Theatrical poster
- Directed by: Sam Newfield as "Peter Steward"
- Screenplay by: Maxwell Shane
- Based on: The Ebb Tide by Robert Louis Stevenson
- Produced by: William H. Pine; William C. Thomas
- Starring: Rory Calhoun; Rhonda Fleming; Paul Kelly; John Abbott; Alan Napier
- Cinematography: Jack Greenhalgh
- Edited by: Howard A. Smith
- Music by: Darrell Calker
- Production company: Pine-Thomas Productions
- Distributed by: Paramount Pictures
- Release date: August 13, 1947
- Running time: 66 minutes
- Country: United States
- Language: English
- Budget: $250,000-$300,000

Adventure Island is a 1947 American South Seas action/adventure film shot in Cinecolor and directed by Sam Newfield (using the pseudonym Peter Stewart) for Paramount Pictures' Pine-Thomas Productions. This marked one of the few times in which Newfield worked for a major studio. The film stars Rory Calhoun and Rhonda Fleming.

This film is a remake of the silent film Ebb Tide (1922) and the film Ebb Tide (1937), all based on the 1894 novel of the same name by Robert Louis Stevenson and his stepson Lloyd Osbourne.

== Plot ==
Three sailors and a woman roam an island ruled by a deadly tyrant.

== Cast ==
- Rory Calhoun as Mr. Herrick
- Rhonda Fleming as Faith Wishart
- Paul Kelly as Capt. Donald Lochlin
- John Abbott as Huish
- Alan Napier as Attwater

== Production ==
The film was produced by Pine-Thomas Productions, which specialized in low-budget action films. However, the budget for this film was larger than that of most Pine-Thomas productions.

Rory Calhoun and Rhoda Fleming were borrowed from David O. Selznick. Filming began in September 1946 on Santa Catalina Island. Ninety percent of the film was shot on the island in order to reduce the need for studio space, and the script was rewritten to minimize indoor scenes.

The owner of the boat used in the film later sued the producers for damaging it.

== Reception ==
In a contemporary review for The New York Times, critic A. H. Weiler compared the film negatively with the 1937 film Ebb Tide: "'Adventure Island' is a dull, incredible and slowly paced fiction of a very venerable school. Paramount's earlier version had the services of Oscar Homolka, Barry Fitzgerald and Ray Milland as well as Technicolor and a professional script. 'Adventure Island' has Cinecolor, which is pleasant, and a script not nearly so pleasant."

== See also ==
- List of films in the public domain in the United States
- Ebb Tide (1922)
- Ebb Tide (1937)
