= Jwar Bhata =

Jwar Bhata (lit. 'tides, tidal wave, ebb and flow') may refer to these Indian films:

- Jwar Bhata (1944 film), directed by Amiya Chakraborty
- Jwar Bhata (1973 film), directed by Adurthi Subba Rao

== See also ==
- Tidal wave (disambiguation)
- Tide (disambiguation)
- Ebb and flow (disambiguation)
