= Ebby =

Ebby is a given name. Notable people with the given name include:

- Ebby DeWeese (1904–1942), American football player
- Ebby Edwards (1884–1961), English trade unionist
- Ebby Halliday (1911– 2015), American realtor
- Ebby Nelson-Addy (born 1992), English footballer
- Ebby Steppach (1997–2015), American murder victim
- Ebby Thacher (1896–1966), sponsor of Alcoholics Anonymous co-founder Bill Wilson

== See also ==
- Ebbie, a 1995 telemovie with the titular character Ebbie Scrooge
- Ebbe
- Ebb (disambiguation)
