= Calling the Swan =

2000 young adult novel by Jean Thesman

- First edition (publ. Viking Juvenile)
- Author: Jean Thesman
- Genre: Young adult fiction
- Publisher: Viking Press
- Publication date: June 1, 2000
- Pages: 176
- ISBN: 0-670-88874-5

Calling the Swan is a 2000 young adult novel by Jean Thesman.

== Plot ==
Skylar Deacon is struggling with many things in her life: a toddler brother, a summer school class in another part of town, riding the bus to get there, new friendships at the school, and conflicting advice from her sister. Most of all, she's struggling with a secret tragedy that has been damaging her family for three years. Her mother is amplifying Skylar's fears and guilt, but Skylar finds help in her strong grandmother, kind priest-counselor, and later her new friends Tasha, Naomi, Margaret, D.J., and Shawn. With their help, she begins to find the courage to heal her life.

== Literary references ==
Mrs. Vargas, Skylar's summer school English teacher, reads stories and poems for class discussion and essays. The following are mentioned and become part of the plot:

- Shirley Jackson, "The Very Strange House Next Door" (short story)
- Ray Bradbury, "There Will Come Soft Rains" (short story)
- D.H. Lawrence, "Snake" (poem)
- Frank O'Connor, "First Confession" (short story)

== Reception ==
Kirkus Reviews rated Calling the Swan "one and a half hankies" and referred to the novel as a "piercingly sad tale of a haunted family". They further highlighted how the novel is "assembled like a jigsaw puzzle, piece by piece" as the author "brings the picture into focus slowly, dropping tantalizing hints".

Publishers Weekly similarly praised Thesman's ability to "expert[ly] control" the narrative so "the reader's grasp of the exact nature of Skylar's tragedy develops in parallel to Skylar's own ability to articulate what has happened". They concluded they review by the calling the novel "hopeful without being sugar-coated" and indicating that it "ffers compassionate insight into loss".

Booklist also reviewed the novel.
