= The Tide =

The Tide(s) may refer to:

- The Tide (light rail), a transit system in Norfolk, Virginia
- The Tide (band), a band formed in 2015
- The Tide (album), a 1994 album by Lucy Kaplansky, or the title track
- The Tide (Nigeria), newspaper in Port Harcourt, Rivers State
- The Tide, a 2008 album by Oceana
- "The Tide", a song by Squarepusher from his 1999 album Budakhan Mindphone
- "The Tide", a song by Niall Horan from his 2017 album Flicker
- The Tides (band), a band from Northern Ireland
- The Tides (Miami Beach), a building in Miami Beach, Florida, US
- The Tides, a building in Lakeshore East, Chicago, Illinois, US

== See also ==
- Tide (disambiguation)
