= Ebba =

- Gender: female

Origin
- Origin: Germanic
- Meaning: modern form of Old English Æbbe.

Other names
- Related names: Ebbe (masculine version)

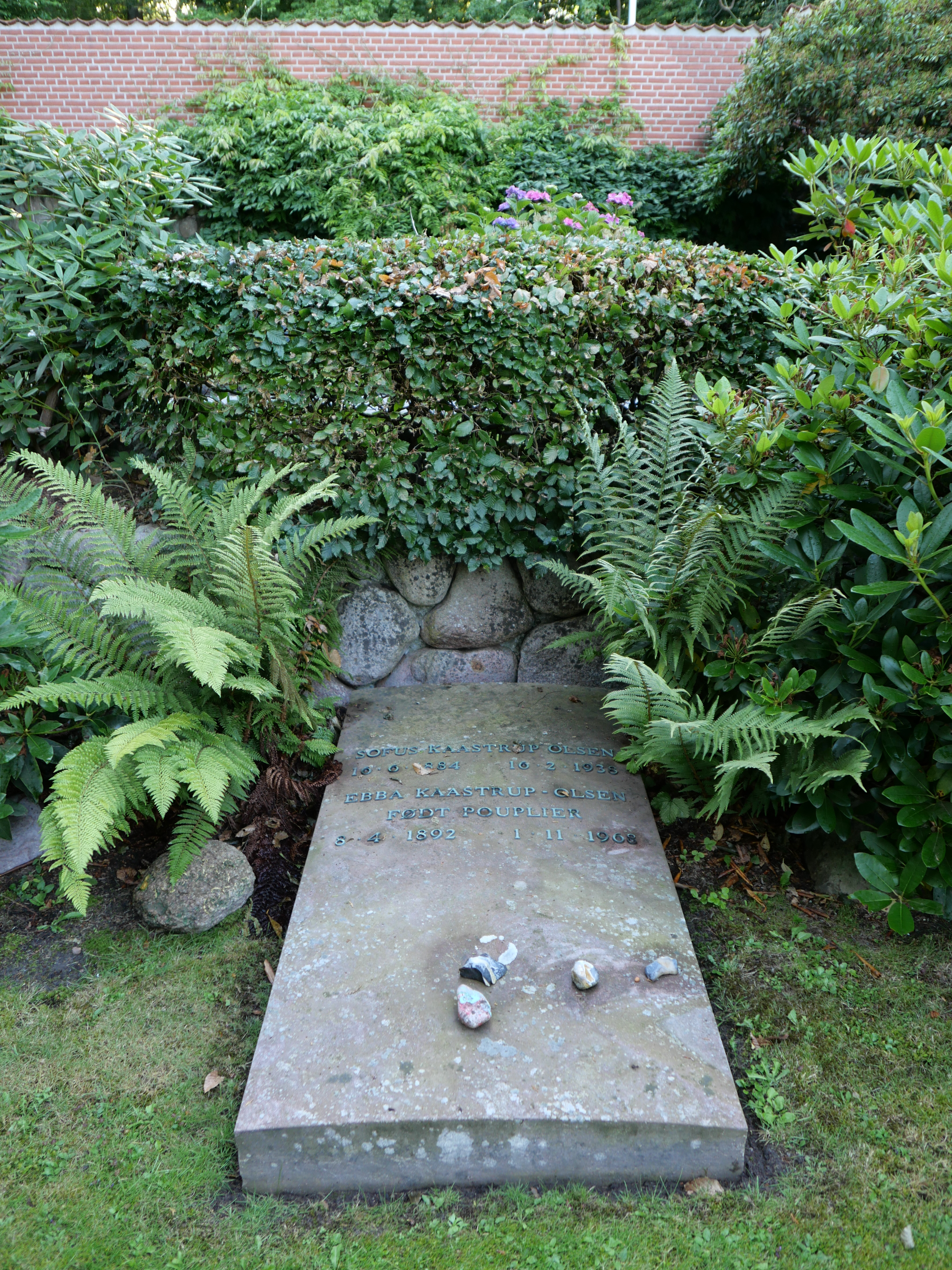

Ebba is a feminine given name, the feminine version of Ebbe, which is a diminutive form of the Germanic name Eberhard or Everhard, meaning "strong." Alternately, it may be a form of an Old English name Æbbe, of unknown derivation, which was the name of several early saints. The name was the 10th most popular name given to girls born in Sweden in 2009.

== People ==
- Ebba Amfeldt (1906–1974), Danish film actress
- Ebba Andersson (born 1997), Swedish cross-country skier
- Ebba Årsjö (born 2001), Swedish para alpine skier
- Ebba d'Aubert (1819–1860), Swedish concert pianist
- Ebba Bielke (1570–1618), Swedish baroness convicted of high treason
- Ebba Boström (1844–1902), Swedish nurse and philanthropist
- Ebba Brahe (1596–1674), Swedish countess and courtier
- Ebba Wicks Brown (1914–2006), American architect
- Ebba Busch (born 1987), Swedish politician, leader of the Christian Democrats
- Ebba Carstensen (1885–1967), Danish-Swedish painter
- Ebba Maria De la Gardie (1657–1697), Swedish poet and countess
- Ebba De la Gardie (1867-1928), Swedish reporter
- Ebba Eriksdotter Vasa (died 1549), Swedish noble, mother of Queen Margaret and her sister Martha
- Ebba Forsberg (born 1964), Swedish singer and actress
- Ebba Haslund (1917–2009), Norwegian writer
- Ebba Hedqvist (born 2006), Swedish ice hockey player
- Ebba Hultkvist Stragne (born 1983), Swedish child actress, TV personality and PR consultant
- Ebba Jungmark (born 1987), Swedish high jumper
- Ebba Leijonhufvud (1595–1654), Swedish countess and courtier
- Ebba Lindkvist (1882–1942), Swedish actress and film director
- Ebba Lindqvist (1908–1995), Swedish poet
- Ebba Modée, (1775–1840), Swedish noble and courtier
- Ebba Morman (1769–1802), Swedish stage actress
- Ebba Munck af Fulkila (1858–1946), Swedish countess and titular princess, married Prince Oscar Bernadotte
- Ebba Tove Elsa Nilsson (born 1987), Swedish singer known as Tove Lo
- Ebba Ramsay (1828–1922), Swedish social worker, writer, and translator
- Ebba Sparre (1629–1662), Swedish noble and courtier
- Ebba Stenbock (died 1614), Swedish noble, sister of Queen Catherine and wife of Klaus Fleming, governor of Finland
- Ebba Svensson Träff (born 2004), Swedish ice hockey player
- Ebba Thomsen (1887–1973), Danish actress
- Ebba von Sydow (born 1981), Swedish journalist and TV personality
- Ebba Witt-Brattström (born 1953), Swedish academic in comparative literature and feminist profile
- Æbbe of Coldingham (c. 615 – 683), Abbess of Coldingham and noblewoman
- Æbbe the Younger (died 817), later abbess of Coldingham
