= Homesick Future =

EP by Young Liars
- Released: February 21, 2012
- Genre: Indie pop, alternative rock, alternative dance
- Label: Nettwerk

Singles from Homesick future
- 1. "Colours" Released: December 20, 2011

Homesick Future is an EP by Canadian indie pop band Young Liars. Originally, released independently by the band in 2011, it was that material which eventually got them signed to Nettwerk where it was given a proper release by the label on February 24, 2012. The EP's single "Colours" was released December 20. 2011.

== Track listing ==
No.	Title	Length
1.	"Echoists"	4:30
2.	"Colours"	5:01
3.	"Navigator Island"	4:36
4.	"Marathon"	4:20
5.	"Homesick Future"	3:48
6.	"Newton, Forgive Me"	5:16
7.	"Great Green Light"	0:54

== Personnel ==
- Jordan Raine – vocals, guitar, drums
- Ty Badali – drums
- Angelo Ismir– guitar, backing vocals
- Andrew Beck – bass
- Wesley Nickel – keyboards, backing vocals

Production

- Digory Smallz- production, mixing & audio engineering
- Christian Wright- mastering
