= High Tide =

High Tide may refer to:

- High tide, the state of tide when the water rises to its highest level

== Film and television ==
- High Tide (1947 film), an American film noir
- Armchair Thriller – High Tide, a 1980 TV film starring Ian McShane
- High Tide (1987 film), an Australian drama film
- High Tide (TV series), 1994–1997
- "High Tide", a 1989 episode of Tugs
- The Reef 2: High Tide, a 2012 South Korean-American animated film
- High Tide (2020 film), an Argentine drama film
- High Tides, the English title of the 2023 Belgian-Dutch television series Knokke Off
- High Tide (2024 film), an American romantic drama film

== Music ==
- High Tide (band) an English rock band formed in 1969
  - High Tide (album), 1970
- High Tyde, an English indie rock band
- High Tide (Justin Nozuka album), 2017
- High Tide (EP), by Harry Fraud, 2013
- "High Tide", a song by Holly Miranda from the 2010 album The Magician's Private Library

== Other uses ==
- High Tide (G.I. Joe), a fictional character

== See also ==
- Tide (disambiguation)
- Rising Tide (disambiguation)
- High Water (disambiguation)
