= Jean Thesman =

American writer

Jean Thesman (1929–2016) was a popular and award-winning novelist for young adults whose predominant theme was the heroine finding her place in the world by coming to understand her family. "I loved telling the story, because I really believed that families were made up of the people you wanted, not the people you were stuck with." —Emily Shepherd

== Biography ==
"My mother taught me to read before I started school, but I had to wait to be six before I could have a library card."

"In 25 years, I wrote 40 books. Most of them came out under my own name, but a few were published under the name T.J. Bradstreet."

She lived in Washington state, and was a member of The Authors Guild and the Society for Children's Book Writers and Illustrators.

Jean Thesman died January 21, 2016, at age 86 after a short illness.

== Works ==
- 1984 New Kid In Town
- 1985 A Secret Love
- 1985 Two Letters for Jenny
- 1987 The Last April Dancers
- 1987 Running Scared
- 1988 Appointment with a Stranger
- 1988 Was It Something I Said?
- 1989 Couldn't I Start Over?
- 1990 Rachel Chance
- 1991 The Rain Catchers
- 1991 Who Said Life Is Fair?
- 1992 When the Road Ends
- 1993 Molly Donnelly
- 1994 Cattail Moon
- 1994 Nothing Grows Here
- 1995 A Night to Remember (contribution)
- 1995 Summerspell
- 1996 The Ornament Tree
- 1997 Be Mine (contribution)
- 1997 The Storyteller's Daughter
- 1998 The Moonstones
- 1999 The Other Ones
- 1999 The Tree of Bells
- 2000 Calling The Swan
- 2001 In the House of the Queen's Beasts
- 2001 A Sea So Far
- 2002 Between
- 2003 Rising Tide
- 2005 Singer

=== The Whitney Cousins series ===
- 1990 Amelia
- 1990 Erin
- 1990 Heather
- 1992 Triple Trouble

=== The Birthday Girls series ===
- 1992 I'm Not Telling
- 1992 Mirror, Mirror
- 1992 Who Am I, Anyway?

=== The Elliott Cousins series ===
- 1998 Jamie
- 1998 Meredith
- 1998 Teresa

=== As T.J. Bradstreet ===
- 1995 Kitty's Wish
- 1996 Lorna's Wish
- 1996 Wendy's Wish
- 1997 Before She Wakes
