= The River is Rising =

The River is Rising and variants may refer to:

- "The River Is Rising", a single by Slash from 4 (2022)
- "The River is Rising", a song by Michael W. Smith from A New Hallelujah (2008)

== See also ==
- Rising Tide (disambiguation)
- The River (disambiguation)
