= Margaret Fritsch =

American architect (1899–1993)

Mary Margaret Goodin Fritsch (November 3, 1899 – June 27, 1993) was an American architect. In 1923, she became the first female graduate of the University of Oregon School of Architecture and in 1926 she became the first licensed female architect in the state of Oregon. She went on to run her own architecture firm and eventually served as a city planner in Alaska.

== Early life ==
Mary Margaret Goodin Fritsch was born as Margaret Goodin on November 3, 1899, in Salem, Oregon, to parents Ella Emily Buck and Richard Bennet Goodin.

After attending Willamette University for a year, she enrolled at the University of Oregon to study pre-med because her father believed that women were best suited to careers in nursing. At the university, Fritsch befriended students who were majoring in architecture, and decided to switch to the School of Architecture. She graduated in 1923, making her the first female graduate of the faculty.

== Career ==
After her graduation, Fritsch completed three years of internship at the firms of Houghtaling and Dougan, Van Etten & Co. and Morris H. Whitehouse. She received her license to practice architecture professionally in 1926, becoming the first licensed female architect in Oregon, and her first commissioned project was the design of the Delta Delta Delta sorority house at the University of Oregon. The same year, she was elected secretary of Oregon's State Board of Architectural Examiners—becoming the first female to hold the position—and held the role until 1956.

Fritsch met her husband, Frederick Fritsch, a fellow architect, in 1925 and they married in 1928. They moved to Philadelphia and completed one collaboration, the Delta Delta Delta sorority house at the University of Pennsylvania in 1929. They returned to Portland, Oregon in 1930, where Margaret set up her own office three years later. Frederick had been diagnosed shortly after their marriage with an incurable disease, and committed suicide in 1934; Margaret adopted an 11-year-old daughter in 1935 to lessen her loneliness.

Fritsch was elected to the American Institute of Architects in 1935 and continued working for her firm until 1940, mainly designing residential houses. After the beginning of World War II, she gave up architecture due to the lack of work and took on a job at the Portland Housing Authority. She moved to Alaska in 1957 and became a city planner for Juneau and Douglas.

== Later life and death ==
Fritsch retired in 1974. She died of pneumonia in 1993, in Juneau, Alaska. She is buried at River View Cemetery in Portland, Oregon.

== See also ==
- Ebba Wicks Brown (1914–2006) architect, the first woman to receive an architectural license by examination in Oregon
