= Young Liars (band) =

Canadian musical group

- Origin: Vancouver, British Columbia, Canada
- Genres: Indie Rock, Synthpop
- Years active: 2008–2016
- Label: Nettwerk
- Members: Jordan Raine; Tyler Badali; Andrew Beck; Wesley Nickel
- Past members: Angelo Ismirnioglou

Young Liars is a Canadian indie rock band based in Vancouver, British Columbia. Their musical style is upbeat and has been described as "synth-infused pop rock".

== History ==
Bassist Andrew Beck, drummer Tyler Badali and singer/guitarist Jordan Raine formed in Vancouver in 2008, and were soon joined by keyboardist Wes Nickel. taking The band's name refers to the David Lapham comic Young Liars. They began performing in the metro-Vancouver area, and later in western Canada. Their performances showed the influence of Foals, Hot Chip, Two Door Cinema Club, and Phoenix.

In February 2011, The Young Liars independently released a seven-track EP, Homesick Future in download-only format. The band's first American performance was in October 2011 at Filter Magazine's Culture Collide Festival in Los Angeles, California. In November that year, the band signed with Nettwerk Records, who re-released the Homesick Future EP in early 2012. The album included the band's debut single, "Colours".

Beginning in 2012, the Young Liars began performing showcases at music festivals, including Rifflandia, NXNE and Sled Island in Canada.

The band released their debut full-length, Tidal Wave in June 2014; the songs featured a more mellow sound than their previous work.

== Discography ==
=== Singles ===
- "Colours"

=== Albums ===
- Tidal Wave (2014)

=== EPs ===
- Homesick Future (2012)
- Night Window (2014)
