= In the House of the Queen's Beasts =

2001 novel by Jean Thesman

- First edition cover (pub. Viking Juvenile)
- Author: Jean Thesman
- Language: English
- Genre: Children's literature
- Publication date: March 2001
- Pages: 176
- ISBN: 978-0-67089285-3

In the House of the Queen's Beasts is a Children's novel by Jean Thesman. It was first published by Viking Press in March 2001.

== Plot ==
Emily Shepherd, her professor stepfather, physician mother, and stepbrother Grady are moving into an older, larger house and Emily is very happy. An accident that scarred her face the year before had left her shunned by friends and foes alike.

Plastic surgery has removed the physical scar but not the psychic one, and the new home is a chance to start over for her. The house comes with a marvelous treehouse and a new neighbour, Rowan Tucker. Rowan's life is full of secrets, most of which surround her antisocial father and their locked-up house. But on the common ground of the treehouse, Emily and Rowan forge a friendship.

Rowan is a woodcarver and has fashioned a series of animals for the treehouse which she names after England's Queen's Beasts; but Rowan's beasts are memorials for animals who have suffered in life and are saved by Rowan's art. The stories she crafts for the carvings bring them to life for Emily, too, who also finds healing through them. In the give and take of real friendship, each gains; perhaps Rowan is finding in Emily the strength to stand up to her father.
