= Aladdin (Horneman opera) =

Danish opera by Christian Frederik Emil Horneman

Aladdin is a Danish opera by Christian Frederik Emil Horneman. It was premiered in Copenhagen on 19 November 1888, and revised 1902. The overture had been premiered in 1865.

== Roles ==
- Aladdin – tenor
- Gulnare – soprano
- Noureddin – bass-baritone
- Sultan – bass
- Vizier – bass
- Morgiane – Hanne Fischer, mezzo-soprano
- Genie of the Lamp – bass
- Genie of the Ring – mezzo-soprano
- Handmaidens – soprano, mezzo-soprano
- Elves – soprano, mezzo-soprano
- Messenger – Jakob Soelberg, bass-baritone
- Choir

== Recording ==
- complete recording Bror Magnus Tödenes, Denise Beck, Johann Reuter, Stephen Milling, Hanne Fischer, Danish National Radio Symphony Choir, Danish National Symphony Orchestra, conducted by Michael Schønwandt rec. 2020, Danish Radio Concert Hall 3CD Da Capo.
