= Æbbe =

Æbbe (or Ebbe) is an Anglo-Saxon female name. It may refer to:

- Saint Æbbe of Coldingham (c. 615–683) or Æbbe the Elder, abbess
- Saint Æbbe of Oxford, saint venerated in Oxfordshire, usually identified with Æbbe of Coldingham
- Saint Æbbe of Minster-in-Thanet or Domne Eafe, 7th century abbess
- Saint Æbbe the Younger of Coldingham (died 870), abbess

== See also ==
- Ebba (disambiguation)
- Ebbe, a given name and surname
