= Cattail Moon =

1994 young adult novel by Jean Thesman

- First edition
- Author: Jean Thesman
- Language: English
- Genre: Young Adult
- Published: 1994 (Houghton Mifflin Harcourt)
- ISBN: 978-0-395-67409-3

Cattail Moon (1994) is a young adult novel written by Jean Thesman.

== Plot ==
Julia Foster gets a chance to break away from her domineering mother for a while by moving from Seattle to a small village in the Cascades called Moon Valley, to live with her father and grandmother. While trying to decide on the course of her life, especially whether she can have a career in music despite her mother's disapproval, she happens on a mysterious figure of an old-fashioned girl at night in the marsh by her house. And she meets Luke, a boy whose fate is tied to the girl in ways he doesn't want to explain to Julia, even though a true affection is blossoming between them. Julia must find the strength to make decisions about herself, her mother, and Luke, and investigating the mystery of the ghost of the marsh may be the way to sort things out.
