= The River =

The River may refer to:

== Films ==
- The River (1929 film), an American film by Frank Borzage
- The River (1933 film), a Czech film by Josef Rovenský
- The River (1938 film), an American film by Pare Lorentz
- The River (1951 film), an American film by Jean Renoir
- Nehir or The River, a 1977 Turkish film by Şerif Gören
- The River (1984 film), an American film by Mark Rydell
- The River (1997 film), a Taiwanese film by Tsai Ming-liang
- The River (2001 film), a Finnish film by Jarmo Lampela
- The River (2002 film), a Russian film by Aleksey Balabanov
- The River (2018 film), a Kazakhstani film by Emir Baigazin

== Literature ==
- The River, a 1903 novel by Eden Phillpotts
- The River, a 1914 novel by Ednah Robinson Aiken
- The River (1925 play), by Patrick Hastings
- The River, a 1946 novel by Rumer Godden
- "The River" (short story), a 1955 short story by Flannery O'Connor
- The River, a 1966 novel by Jeff Sutton
- The River (novel), a 1991 novel by Gary Paulsen
- The River, a 1999 book about a debunked theoretical origin of HIV/AIDS by Edward Hooper
- The River, a 2015 non-fiction book by Helen Humphreys

== Music ==
=== Compositions ===
- The River, film score and orchestral suite by Virgil Thomson, 1937
- The River, orchestral suite from the ballet music by Duke Ellington, 1970

=== Albums ===
- The River (Ali Farka Touré album) (1991)
- The River (Bruce Springsteen album) (1980)
- The River (Jordan Feliz album), and the title song (see below) (2016)
- The River (Ketil Bjørnstad album) (1997)
- The River, an album by Mick Stevens
- The River, an album by Neal Morse

=== Songs ===
- "The River" (Elgar), a composition of Edward Elgar
- "The River" (Breed 77 song) (2004)
- "The River" (Garth Brooks song) (1992)
- "The River" (Good Charlotte song) (2007)
- "The River" (Jordan Feliz song) (2016)
- "The River" (Liam Gallagher song), 2019
- "The River" (Delta Goodrem song) (2016)
- "The River" (Noel Gourdin song) (2007)
- "The River" (Live song) (2006)
- "The River" (Bruce Springsteen song) (1980)
- "The River" (The Tea Party song) (1993)
- "The River", a song by 10 Years from From Birth to Burial
- "The River", a song by Anathallo from Canopy Glow
- "The River", a song by Meredith Andrews from The Invitation
- "The River", a song by Aurora from A Different Kind of Human (Step 2)
- "The River", a song by the Beautiful South from Painting It Red
- "The River", a song by Joe Bonamassa from Had to Cry Today
- "The River", a song by Tim Buckley from Blue Afternoon
- "The River", a song by David Byrne and Brian Eno from Everything That Happens Will Happen Today
- "The River", a song by Tom Chaplin from The Wave
- "The River", a song by the Cult from Sonic Temple
- "The River (Le Colline Sono In Fiore)", a song by Ken Dodd
- "The River Song", a song by Donovan from The Hurdy Gurdy Man
- "The River", a song by Dan Fogelberg from Home Free
- "The River", a song by Missy Higgins from The Sound of White
- "The River", a song by Imagine Dragons from It's Time
- "The River", a song by Insomnium from Shadows of the Dying Sun
- "The River", a song by Lyfe Jennings from The Phoenix
- "The River", a song by King Gizzard & the Lizard Wizard from Quarters!
- "The River" or "River", a song by King Trigger
- "The River", a song by Ladyhawke from Wild Things
- "The River", a song by John Martyn from The Apprentice
- "The River", a song by Parkway Drive from Atlas
- "The River", a song by Santana from Festival
- "The River", a song by Sentenced from Crimson
- "The River", a song by Spirit from California Blues
- "The River (Tongo)", a song by Mike Stern from Voices
- "The River", a song by Strawbs from Bursting at the Seams
- "The River", a song by Sylosis from Monolith
- "The River", a song by Wage War from Blueprints
- "The River", a song by Wild Orchid from the self-titled album
- "The River", a song by Hank Williams, Jr. from Ballads of the Hills and Plains
- "The River", a song by Keller Williams from Freek
- "The River", a song by Chely Wright from The Metropolitan Hotel
- "The River", a song by Travis from L.A. Times

== Radio stations ==
- The River, KIWR 89.7 FM, Council Bluffs, Iowa, US
- The River, WXRV 92.5 FM, Haverhill, Massachusetts, US
- The River, WRSI 93.9 FM, Turners Falls, Massachusetts, US
- The River, WOLZ 95.3 FM, Fort Myers, Florida, US
- The River, WZRV 95.3 FM, Front Royal, Virginia, US
- The River, WERV-FM 95.9 FM, Chicago, Illinois, US
- The River, KRVE 96.1 FM, Baton Rouge, Louisiana, US
- The River, WSRV 97.1 FM, Gainesville, Georgia, US
- The River, WRVV 97.3 FM, Harrisburg, Pennsylvania, US
- The River, KVRV 97.7 FM, Santa Rosa, California, US
- The River, CFAN-FM 99.3 FM, Miramichi, New Brunswick, Canada
- The River, WRVE 99.5 FM, Schenectady, New York, US
- The River, WVRV 101.5 FM, Montgomery, Alabama, US
- The River, WURV 103.7 FM, Richmond, Virginia, US
- The River, WCVO 104.9 FM, Gahanna, Ohio, US
- Triple M The Border, 105.7 FM, Albury, New South Wales, Australia, formerly branded The River
- The River, WHCN 105.9 FM, Hartford, Connecticut, US
- The River, KRVK 107.9 FM, Vista West, Wyoming, US

== Television ==
=== Episodes ===
- "The River", Arctic Air season 3, episode 1 (2014)
- "The River", Carnivàle season 1, episode 7 (2003)
- "The River", Castlevania season 2, episode 6 (2021)
- "The River", Cold Case season 3, episode 22 (2006)
- "The River", Cover Me (American) episode 22 (2001)
- "The River", Gunsmoke season 18, episodes 1–2 (1972)
- "The River", Korg: 70,000 B.C. episode 13 (1974)
- "The River", Lassie (1954) season 17, episode 16 (1971)
- "The River", Police Rescue season 5, episode 4 (1996)
- "The River", See season 1, episode 4 (2019)
- "The River", So Weird season 3, episode 26 (2001)
- "The River", The Bill series 16, episode 70; part three of Beech II (2000)
- "The River", The Forest Rangers season 2, episode 24 (1964)

=== Shows ===
- The River (South African TV series), a telenovela
- The River (British TV series), a 1988 television series starring David Essex
- The River (American TV series), a 2012 paranormal adventure-horror series
- The River (TV play), 1951 British television play

== Other uses ==
- The River (artwork), a 1994 fountain in Victoria Square, Birmingham, England
- The River, Barbuda, a locale in South Coast, Barbuda
- The River (Greece), a political party in Greece
- The River (skyscraper), a building in Bangkok, Thailand
- The River (dance), choreographed (1970) by Alvin Ailey to a score of the same title by Duke Ellington
- Indian River State College, or The River, Fort Pierce, Florida, U.S.

== See also ==
- The River is Rising (disambiguation)
- River (disambiguation)
- River Song (disambiguation)
- La Rivière (Maillol)
- The Ties That Bind: The River Collection, a 2015 compilation album by Bruce Springsteen
- Te Awa (disambiguation)
