= Tydal =

Tydal may refer to:

- Tydal Municipality, a municipality in Trøndelag county, Norway
- Tydalen, a valley in Trøndelag county
- Tydal Church, in Tydal Municipality

== See also ==
- Tidal (disambiguation)
