= River Song (disambiguation) =

River Song is a recurring character in the Doctor Who TV programme.

River Song may also refer to:

- "River Song" (song), the opening track of Dennis Wilson's 1977 album Pacific Ocean Blue
- River Songs, the third full-length studio album by American band The Badlees
- "River Song", a 1973 song from the movie Tom Sawyer composed by Robert B. Sherman and Richard M. Sherman
- River Song: A Novel, 1989 novel by Craig Lesley

== See also ==
- River (disambiguation) § Music, for songs titled "River"
- Song River
- The Diary of River Song, an audio play series involving the Doctor Who character
- The River (disambiguation)
- The Song of the Rivers
