= Tidal =

Tidal is the adjectival form of tide.

Tidal may also refer to:

- Tidal (album), a 1996 album by Fiona Apple
- Tidal (king), a king involved in the Battle of the Vale of Siddim
- TidalCycles, a live coding environment for music
- Tidal (service), a music streaming service
- Tidal: Occupy Theory, Occupy Strategy, a magazine associated with the Occupy Wall Street movement

== See also ==
- Tidal flow (traffic), the flow of traffic thought of as an analogy with the flow of tides
- Tidal force, a secondary effect of the force of gravity and is responsible for the tides
- Tidal power, energy harnessed by converting energy from tides
- Tide (disambiguation)
- Tydal (disambiguation)
