= Ebbe Carsten Hornemann =

Norwegian politician (1784–1851)

Ebbe Carsten Hornemann (21 January 1784 – 1 June 1851) was a Norwegian politician.

Hornemann was born in Trondheim, Norway. He was the son of Henrik Horneman (1738–1807) and Abel Margrethe Hersleb (1747–1813). His father was a landowner and Justice. His brother Christian Hersleb Hornemann was a Constitutional founding father. Ebbe Carsten Hornemann was cand.jur. of education, but did not work as a civil servant.

Hornemann was elected to the Norwegian Parliament (Storting) in 1830, representing the constituency of Holmestrand. He sat through only one term.

He lived in Holmestrand until 1834, when he moved to Trondhjem. In 1851 he bought a farm in Rissen Municipality, but he died later that year. In 1811 he married Nicoline Andrea Christensen (1792–1827) from Holmestrand. Their oldest son Henrik Hornemann would become a member of parliament.
