= Ebbe Gilbe =

Swedish documentary filmer and director

Ebbe Einar Gilbe
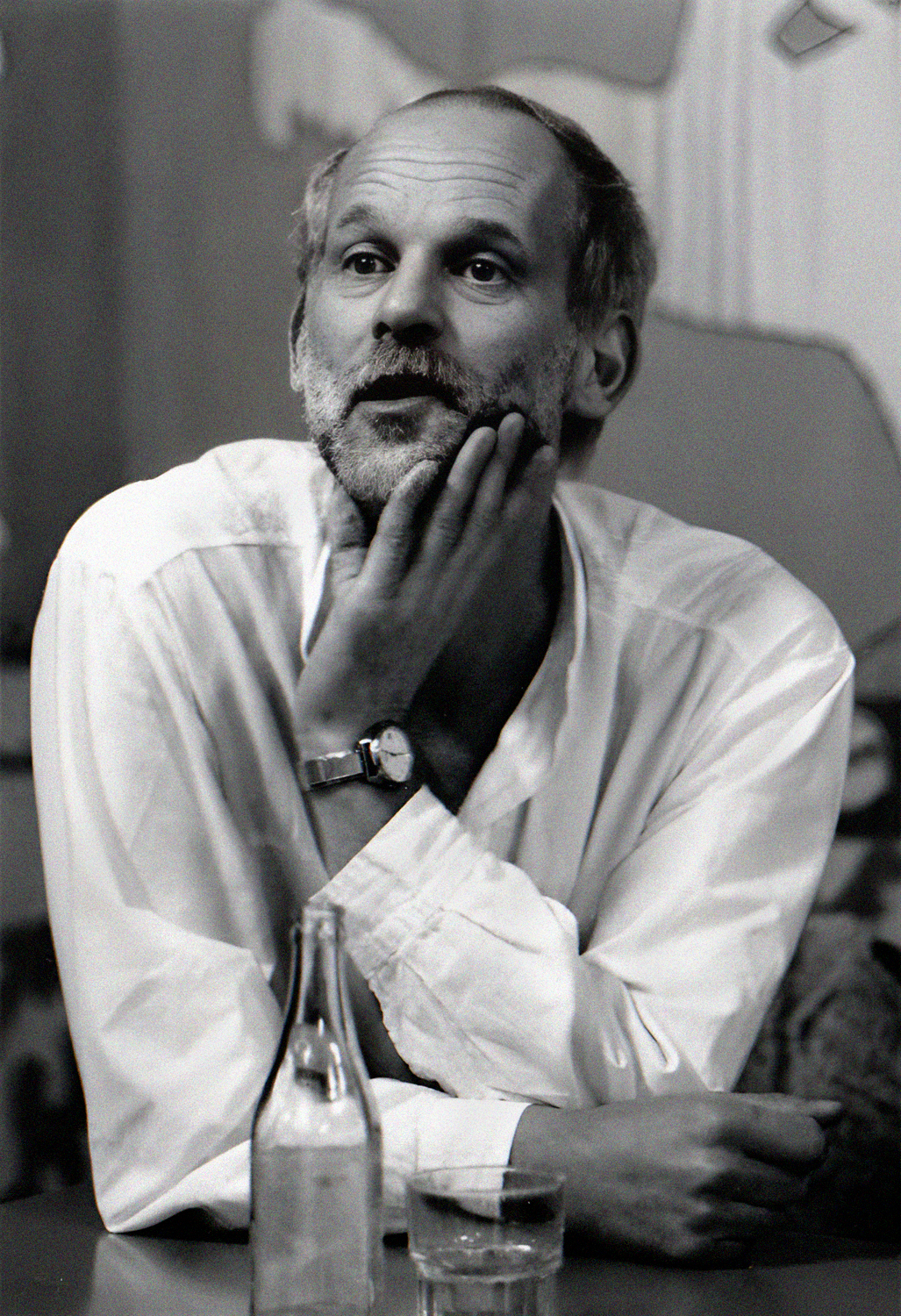
- Born: 12 February 1940
- Died: 29 April 2008 (aged 68)
- Occupation: Director

Ebbe Einar Gilbe (12 February 1940 – 29 April 2008) was a Swedish documentary filmer and director. He had previously worked as a gardener and psychiatric nurse in Vipeholm.

In 1970, he was employed at Sveriges Television. In 1988, he made the documentary called Så går ett år, about Sjöbo in Skåne, a municipality which during the duration of filming became known for holding a referendum to decide what to do with the refugees that came to the town. After twenty years at SVT Gilbe became a freelance filmer. In 1996 he made Liten mässa för svinen along with filmer Thomas Frantzén. In 1999, he completed a documentary series called I en annan värld that consisted of three films about autism called Tommy och katastrofen, Kennie och människovärdet and Fredrik och verkligheten.

His last film was Drömmen om det goda livet (2007) about the German vacation island Rügen.

== Films ==
- 1981 Höst, snart vinter, Skåne 1980
- 1982 Mot bistrare tider
- 1988 Så går ett år – Tiden i Sjöbo
- 1992 En gång i Sverige
- 1994 Genom himlen över jorden
- 1996 Liten mässa för svinen
- 1997 Skärvor – dagar, år
- 1999 I en annan värld (Trilogi)
- 1999 Punktering
- 2002 Under cirkuskupolen (Det drömmar är gjorda av)
- 2007 Drömmen om det goda livet
