= Tidal Wave (Young Liars album) =

Studio album by Young Liars
- Released: June 24, 2014
- Genre: Indie rock; synthpop; electronica; art rock
- Label: Nettwerk
- Producer: Tyler Johnson

Young Liars chronology
Homesick Future (2012)	Tidal Wave (2014)

Singles from Tidal Wave
- 1. "Night Window" Released: April 24, 2014

Tidal Wave is the debut studio album by Canadian indie pop rock band Young Liars. It was released June 24, 2014 via Nettwerk.

== Track listing ==
No.	Title	Length
1.	"An Odyssey Love"	3:08
2.	"Young Again"	3:28
3.	"Tidal Wave"	3:53
4.	"U-Dreams"	3:59
5.	"Challenging Aquilon"	2:23
6.	"Night Window"	3:11
7.	"Supertramp"	3:34
8.	"Runaway"	4:14
9.	"Lovely and Wild"	4:51
10.	"Tiny Creatures"	4:36
11.	"Blooming Hearts"	5:04
12.	"Ocean Arms"	2:54
