= Ebbe Schön =

Swedish author (1929–2022)

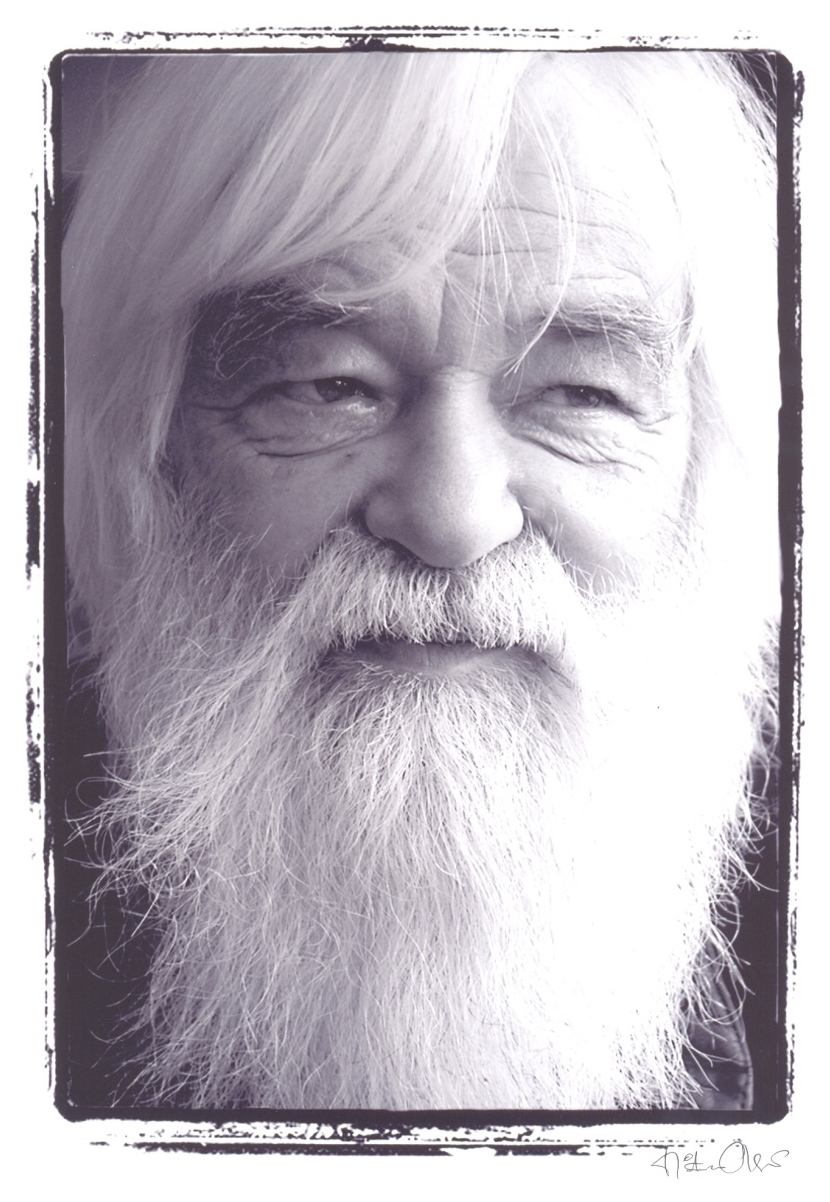
- Ebbe Schön in 2004
- Died: 4 August 2022 (aged 92)
- Occupations: author, professor and folklorist

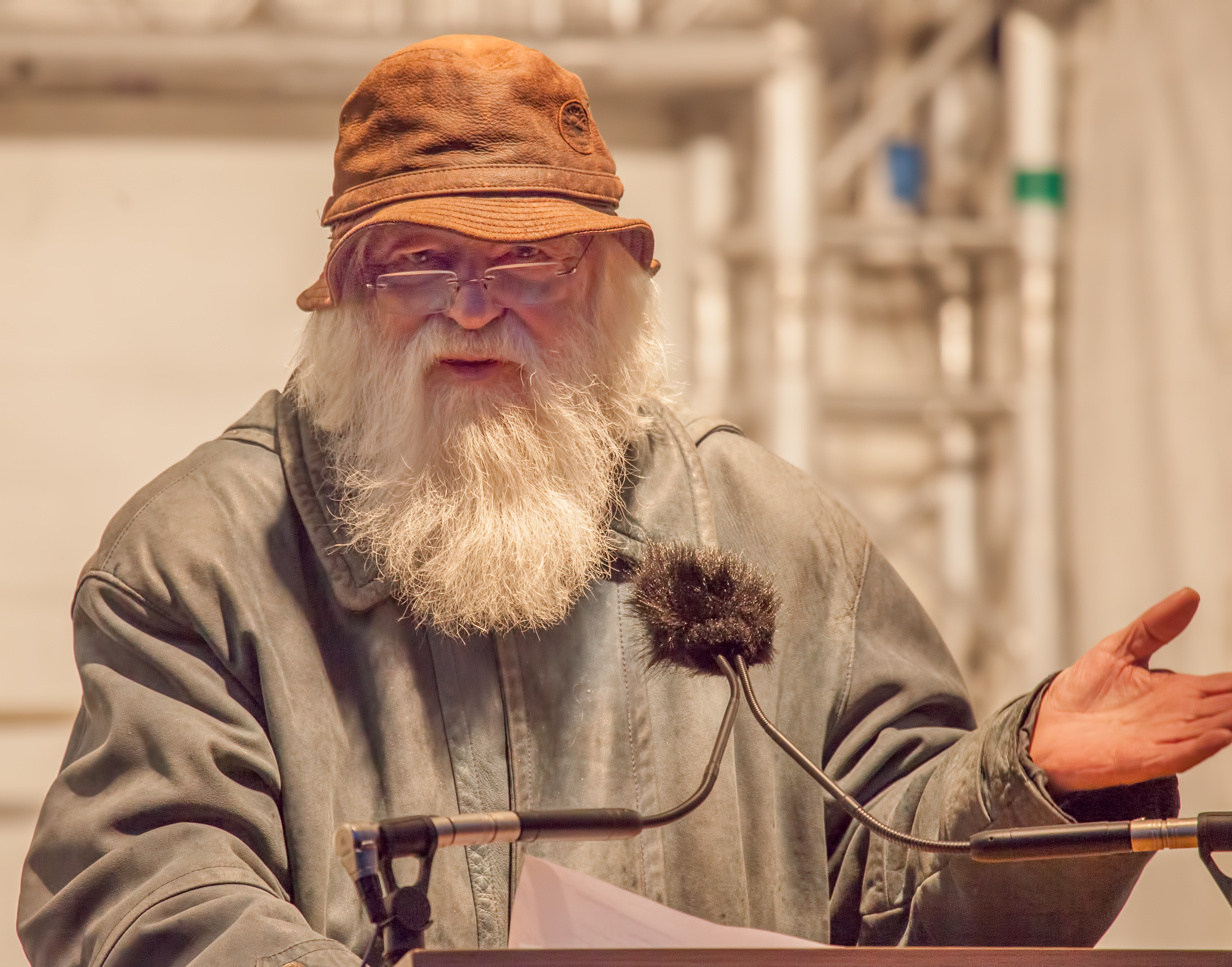
Schön at Skansen, Stockholm in 2013

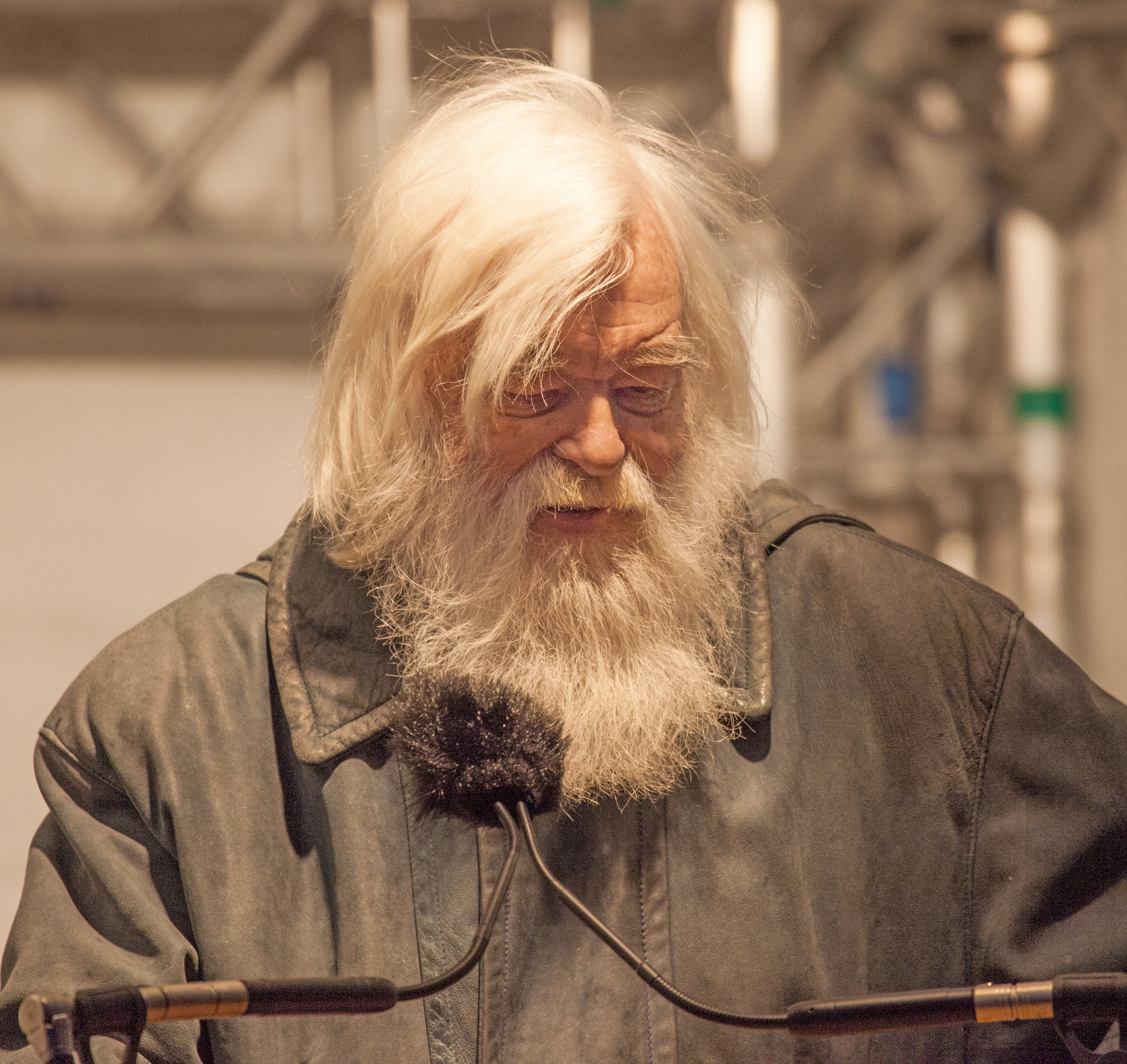
Schön at Skansen, Stockholm in 2013

Ebbe Schön (13 December 1929 – 4 August 2022) was a Swedish author, folklorist and associate professor in literature at Stockholm University. Besides literature, he studied ethnology, Scandinavian languages and Slavonic languages at Stockholm University.

Among other things, he worked as a naval radio operator and as a press officer and film producer at the Swedish Naval Staff, and was a radio and TV producer at Swedish Radio and Swedish Television. Schön was the head of Sweden's largest folklore collection at the Nordic Museum in Stockholm for almost two decades. He wrote many books about literature, folklore and Norse mythology, both for adults and children.

== Bibliography ==
- Jan Fridegård och forntiden: en studie i diktverk och källor (doctor's dissertation) (1973)
- Jan Fridegård: proletärdiktaren och folkkulturen (1978)
- Julen förr i tiden (1980)
- Folktro i Bohuslän (1983)
- Älvor, vättar och andra väsen: en bok om gammal folktro (1986)
- Trollguld (1986)
- Karolinens pojke (1988)
- Folktrons år: gammalt skrock kring årsfester, märkesdagar och fruktbarhet (1989)
- Roddarpojken (1990)
- Häxor och trolldom (1991)
- Luffar-Olas rim och ramsor (1991)
- Kungar, krig och katastrofer: vår historia i sägen och tro (1993)
- Älskogens magi: folktro om kärlek och lusta (1996)
- Vår svenska tomte: sägner och folktro (1996)
- Troll (1997)
- Sjöjungfrur, stenhuggare och gnistapor: kulturhistoriska essäer (1997)
- Svensk folktro A-Ö: hur vi tänkt, trott och trollat (1998)
- Svenska traditioner: årets fester och livets högtider (1998)
- Troll och människa: gammal svensk folktro (1999)
- Drakar och trollormar (1999)
- De döda återvänder: folktro om tillvarons gränsland (2000)
- Älvor, troll och talande träd: folktro om svensk natur (2000)
- Folktro från förr (2001)
- Skepnader i skymningen: möten med folktrons väsen (2001)
- Folktro om ödet och lyckan (2002)
- Silverpipan (2002)
- Trollkistan (2003)
- Asa-Tors hammare: gudar och jättar i tro och tradition (2004)
- Folktrons ABC (2004)
- Kungar, krig och katastrofer: vår historia i sägen och tro (new enlarged edition) (2005)
- Vår svenske tomte: sägner och folktro (new enlarged edition) (2006)
- Folktro på fäbodvall (2006)
- Jätten i Brofjäll (2007)
- Svenska sägner (2008)
- Häxkonster och kärleksknep (2008)
- Ödet och lyckan (new edition of Folktro om ödet och lyckan) (2009)
- Erotiska väsen (2010)
- Kungar, krig och katastrofer: vår historia i sägen och tro (new enlarged edition) (2011)
- Fotspår på röd granit: glimtar från min vandring i tiden (2012)
- Gårdstomtens långa minne (2014)
- Fan i båten (2015)
- Mat, dryck och magi (2016)
- Gårdstomten på Ryk (2018)
- Vår svenske tomte: sägner och folktro (new enlarged edition) (2018)
- Ängel med bockfot (2019)
- Gårdstomtens tårar (2022)

Besides, Ebbe Schön participates in a number of anthologies, newspapers, magazines and yearbooks.

== Awards and honours ==
- Studieförbundet Vuxenskolans folkbildningsstipendium (1989)
- Bohuslandstingets kulturpris (1990)
- Mickelpriset awarded by Berättarnätet Kronoberg and Studieförbundet Vuxenskolan in Ljungby (1999)
- Kungl. Patriotiska Sällskapets Gösta Berg-medalj (2004)
- Jöran Sahlgren-pris awarded by Kungl. Gustav Adolfs Akademien för svensk folkkultur (2005)
- Bohusläningens kulturpris (2011)
