= Rising Tide (Thesman novel) =

2003 novel by Jean Thesman

- First edition
- Author: Jean Thesman
- Language: English
- Genre: Historical novel
- Publisher: Viking Juvenile
- Publication date: October 13, 2003
- Publication place: United States
- Media type: Print (Hardback)
- Pages: 240 pages
- ISBN: 0-670-03656-0
- OCLC: 51800816
- LC Class: PZ7.T3525 Ri 2003
- Preceded by: A Sea So Far

Rising Tide (2003) is a historical young-adult novel by Jean Thesman and a sequel to her novel A Sea So Far (2001).

== Plot summary ==
Kate Keeley has returned from Ireland older and wiser. Her goals are still to move her and her aunt out of the boardinghouse and to open a linens shop. Ellen Flannery hasn't saved her share for the store she planned to be a partner in because she has spent it pursuing the rich, careless Aaron Schuster. But with the help of money from Jolie Logan's father, Kate does find a flat and an empty shop. Finally, Kate and Ellen open their store and pursue the novelty of independent womanhood. At the boardinghouse, Mrs. Flannery is getting sick and the boarders are more demanding than ever, especially the acidic Mrs. Stackhouse and the abandoned Thalia Rutledge. Though they dream of independence, Kate and Ellen realise they will always be tied to family, home, and the lure of romance, such as Kate's finding the travel journal of a mysterious and attractive stranger.
