= The Other Ones (novel) =

1999 book by Jean Thesman

- First edition
- Author: Jean Thesman
- Genre: young-adult
- Published: 1999
- Publisher: Viking Press
- ISBN: 0141312467

The Other Ones is a young-adult fantasy novel by Jean Thesman. It was first published in May 1999 by Viking Press.

== Plot summary ==
Bridget Raynes has typical teenage problems—clumsiness, lack of popularity, an unrequited crush, oblivious parents—but they are compounded by her suppressed magical powers, or perhaps her loss of sanity. She sees spirits, especially the quarrelsome "threshold guardian" xiii, reads minds, moves objects by thought, and casts "circles of safety" spells. But her powers inspire more fear than awe in her, and she continues to avoid them just when they are needed most. Her crush Jordan is abandoned in his own home; new girl Althea is being tormented at school while on a secret mission; school bully Woody is growing more dangerous; even the natural world is threatened and threatening. Only her aunt Cait, a rumored witch herself, has any sympathy for Bridget, but she must decide once and for all to accept her powers or not.
