= Ebb Tide (1922 film) =

1922 film by George Melford

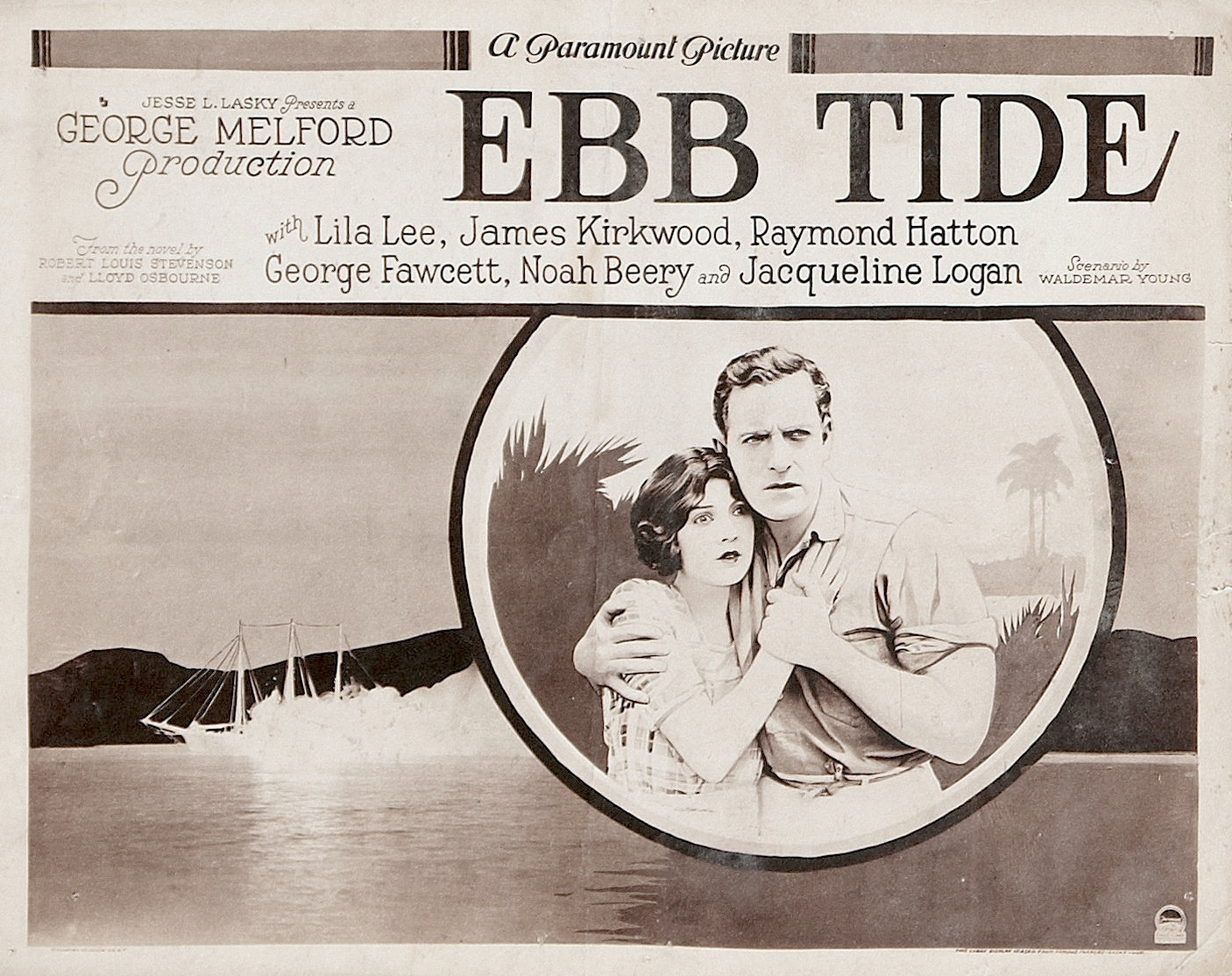
- Lobby card
- Directed by: George Melford
- Written by: Waldemar Young (scenario)
- Based on: The Ebb-Tide by R. L. Stevenson and Lloyd Osbourne
- Produced by: Adolph Zukor; Jesse L. Lasky; George Melford
- Starring: Lila Lee; James Kirkwood
- Cinematography: Bert Glennon; James Wong Howe (assistant camera)
- Distributed by: Paramount Pictures
- Release dates: November 18, 1922 (NYC Premiere); December 4, 1922 (General release)
- Running time: 8 reels (7,336 feet)
- Country: United States
- Language: Silent (English intertitles)

Ebb Tide is a 1922 American silent adventure film produced by Famous Players–Lasky and distributed by Paramount Pictures, directed by George Melford, and based on the 1894 novel The Ebb-Tide by Robert Louis Stevenson and his step-son Lloyd Osbourne. The story had been filmed before in 1915 by the Selig Polyscope Company.

The film would be filmed again in 1937 and in 1947 as Adventure Island. Melford's production is now considered a lost film.

== Plot ==
Based on a review in a film publication, Ruth Attwater ives with her father Richard Attwater on an uncharted island in the South Seas. She has never seen another white man, and her father threatens to kill any who come to the island.

Three derelicts are brought by fate by their boat to the island, and Richard invites them to dinner so he can show his collection of pearls and then kill them if they do not immediately leave. Robert Herrick, an Englishman who has made a failure of his life, sees Ruth and decides not to leave but hides. Captain Davis and Huish plan to rob Richard of the pearls. They come ashore with a flag of peace, but Richard suspects their intentions and masters them.

Robert and Ruth escape to the boat in the harbor, but Richard pursues them. The boat catches fire killing Richard. Ruth and Robert jump into the sea and are attacked by an octopus, but natives rescue them.

== Cast ==
- Lila Lee as Ruth Attwater
- James Kirkwood as Robert Herrick
- Raymond Hatton as J.L. Huish
- George Fawcett as Captain Davis
- Noah Beery as Richard Attwater
- Jacqueline Logan as Tehura

== See also ==
- Ebb Tide (1937)
- Adventure Island (1947)
