= Tide (disambiguation) =

A tide is the rise and fall of a sea level caused by the Moon's gravity and other factors.

Tide(s) may also refer to:

== Media ==
- The Tide (Nigeria), a newspaper
- Tide (TV series), 2019 Irish/Welsh/Scottish documentary series
- WTKN, a radio station licensed to Murrells inlet, South Carolina, United States and known as 94.5 the Tide from 2015 to 2019
- Tides (film), a 2021 German-Swiss science fiction thriller film

== Music ==
- Tide (album), a 1970 album by Antonio Carlos Jobim
- Tides (Arovane album), 2000
- Tides (Phaeleh album), 2013
- Tides (Bethel Music album), 2013
- "Tide", a song by Humanity's Last Breath from their 2021 album Välde
- "Tides", a song by Chaos Divine from their 2015 album Colliding Skies
- "Tides", a song by Ed Sheeran from his 2021 album =
- "Tides", a song by Ellie Goulding from her 2020 album Brightest Blue
- "Tides", a song by Hawkwind from their 1988 album The Xenon Codex
- "Tides", a song by KSI from his 2020 album Dissimulation
- "Tides", a song by Miss May I from their 2009 album Apologies Are for the Weak
- "Tides", a song by Suede from their 2018 album The Blue Hour
- "Tides", a song by The xx from their 2012 album Coexist

== Sports ==
- Alabama Crimson Tide, an American collegiate sports program
- Halifax Tides FC, a Canadian professional soccer club
- Norfolk Tides, a minor league baseball team
- The Institute for Diversity and Ethics in Sport

== Transport ==
- Tide (transportation company), a public transportation company in Norway
- The Tide (light rail), a light rail system in Norfolk, Virginia, US
- Tide-class tanker, supply ships for Britain's Royal Navy

== Other uses ==
- Tide (financial service), a UK financial technology company
- Tide (brand), a laundry detergent made by Procter & Gamble
- Tide (Pillow Pal), a Pillow Pal whale made by Ty, Inc.
- Tide, Oregon, an unincorporated US community
- Tides Center, a non-profit organization in San Francisco, CA
- DARPA TIDES program, launched to stimulate research on multilingual information extraction technology
- Terrorist Identities Datamart Environment, a terrorist-screening database
- Hour, from its Old English name tīd
- Canonical hour, from the same word
- Liturgical season, from the same word, now usually only as a suffix

== See also ==
- Tide dial, a sundial listing the canonical hours
- The Tide (disambiguation)
- Tidal (disambiguation)
- High tide (disambiguation)
- Ebb tide (disambiguation)
- Jwar Bhata (disambiguation)
