= Ebba Wicks Brown =

American architect (1914–2006)

- Born: Ebba Lenore Wicks; January 15, 1914; Astoria, Oregon, U.S.
- Died: April 15, 2006 (aged 92)
- Resting place: Ocean View Cemetery, Warrenton, Oregon, U.S.
- Education: University of Oregon (BA, B.Arch); Cranbrook Academy of Art (M.Arch)
- Occupation: Architect
- Years active: 1938–1979
- Spouse: Ernest E. Brown (m. 1950)

Ebba Wicks Brown (née Ebba Lenore Wicks; January 15, 1914 – April 15, 2006) was an American architect. She was the first woman to receive an architectural license by examination in the state of Oregon in 1942, and was the first woman to serve as on the Oregon State Board of Architect Examiners in 1960. She was part of the firms Wicks & Wicks Architects, Wicks & Brown Architects, and Brown, Brown & Grider.

== Early life, family, and education ==
Ebba Lenore Wicks was born on January 15, 1914, in Astoria, Oregon. Both of her parents were immigrants from Finland, Maria Olivia Cedarberg and John Erik Wicks. Her father was an architect that practiced in Astoria. Ebba was the youngest of three sisters. She attended Astoria High School.

Wicks graduated from the University of Oregon in Eugene with a Bachelor of Arts degree in 1936 and a Bachelor of Architecture degree in 1938. She continued her studies in architecture in 1945 at Cranbrook Academy of Art in Bloomfield Hills, Michigan, under Eliel Saarinen.

Wicks and Ernest "Ernie" E. Brown married in 1950 in Michigan, he was also an architect.

== Career ==
After graduation she worked as an apprentice under her father, designing custom residences in cities of Astoria, Seaside, and Hammond. She helped her father with blueprint, working from his office in the attic of Astoria's city hall.

In 1942, she completed her exams, and Wicks was the first woman to receive an architectural license by examination in the state of Oregon. In the mid-1940s, she co-founded the firm Wicks & Wicks Architects, alongside her father John Erik Wicks.

Wicks moved to Bloomfield Hills, Michigan in 1945, to study at Cranbrook Academy of Art. In 1954, she moved back to Astoria with her husband; and alongside her father John Erik Wicks, they founded the firm Wicks & Brown, Architects. Wicks was named as a member of the Oregon State Board of Architect Examiners in 1960, and she was the first woman to hold this title.

Brown retired in 1979 but remained active in local community design projects. She died on April 15, 2006.

== List of works ==
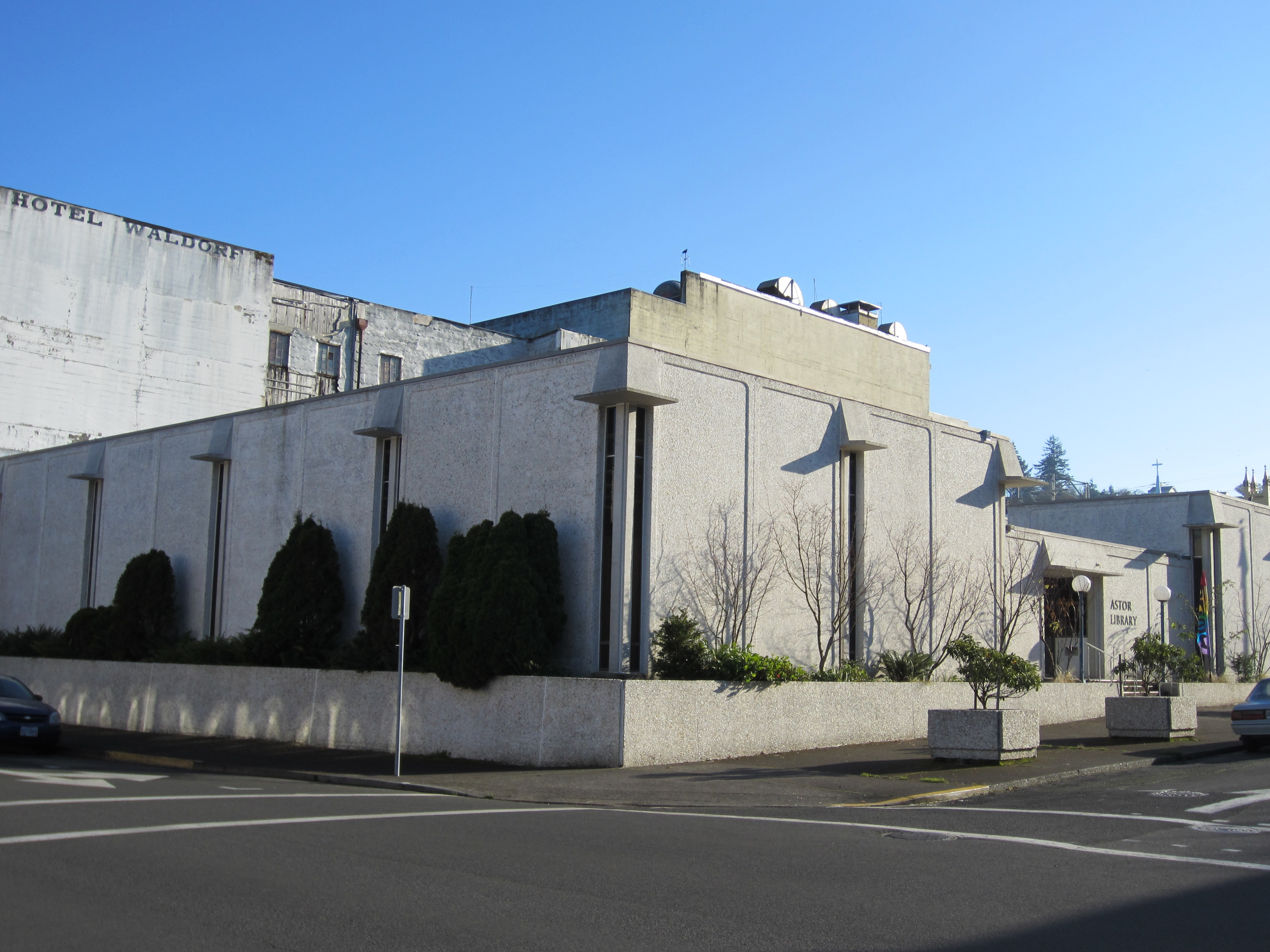
Astoria Library and Veterans Memorial (2011), designed by Brown, Brown & Grider

=== Wicks & Wicks Architects ===
- 1947, Cochran's department store, Astoria, Oregon
- 1951, Zion Lutheran Church, Astoria, Oregon
- 1951, First Church of Christ, Scientist, Astoria, Oregon

=== Wicks & Brown, Architects ===
- 1956, Captain Edgar Quinn house
- 1962, Fisher Bros. Industrial Supply
- 1962, US Bank, Seaside, Oregon

=== Brown, Brown & Grider ===
- 1967, Astoria Library and Veterans Memorial, 450-10th Street, Astoria, Oregon
- 1968, Illahee Apartments
- 1970, Daily Astorian Building
- 1971, US Bank, Astoria, Oregon

== See also ==
- Margaret Fritsch (1899–1993), American architect, and the first women to be a licensed architect in Oregon
