= Ebb Tide (1937 film) =

1937 film by James P. Hogan

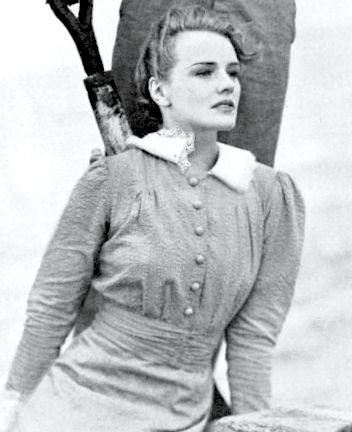
- Frances Farmer in the film
- Directed by: James P. Hogan
- Written by: Bertram Millhauser
- Based on: The Ebb-Tide by Robert Louis Stevenson and Lloyd Osbourne
- Produced by: Lucien Hubbard
- Starring: Oscar Homolka; Frances Farmer; Ray Milland
- Cinematography: Ray Rennahan; Leo Tover
- Edited by: LeRoy Stone
- Music by: Victor Young
- Production company: Paramount Pictures
- Distributed by: Paramount Pictures
- Release dates: November 17, 1937 (New York City); November 26, 1937 (United States)
- Running time: 94 minutes
- Country: United States
- Language: English

Ebb Tide is a 1937 American Technicolor adventure film directed by James P. Hogan and starring Oscar Homolka, Frances Farmer and Ray Milland.

Much of the film is set in the South Seas and is based on the 1894 novel The Ebb-Tide by Robert Louis Stevenson and his stepson Lloyd Osbourne.

The novel was previously filmed as 1922 Paramount silent film Ebb Tide, and it was filmed again in 1947 as Adventure Island, produced by William H. Pine and William C. Thomas.

== Plot ==
In 1890, three Westerners stranded on a tropical island in the South Pacific get an offer to take over operation of a cargo boat.

== Cast ==
- Oscar Homolka as Capt. Thorbecke
- Frances Farmer as Faith Wishart
- Ray Milland as Robert Herrick
- Lloyd Nolan as Attwater
- Barry Fitzgerald as Huish
- Charles Judels as Port doctor
- Charles Stevens as Uncle Ned
- David Torrence as Tapena Tom
- Lina Basquette as Attwater's servant

== Production ==
Paramount had previously filmed the story in 1922. In March 1937 they announced they would film the story again under the title of With the Tide starring Frances Farmer, and produced by Lucien Hubbard. Lloyd Osborne was writing the script and Hubbard wanted Henry Hathaway to direct. Paramount were going to make the film as one of its two color movies for the season.

By April Paramount had decided to revert to the story's original title and Ray Milland had joined the cast with Hathaway to direct. Then Oscar Homolka, at the time best known for playing a role in Rhodes of Africa, signed a four-year contract with Paramount and was given a lead role in Ebb Tide. Barry Fitzgerald and Lloyd Nolan rounded out the main cast.

Henry Hathaway was delayed on shooting Souls at Sea so he was replaced as director by James Hogan.

Filming started June 1937. Island scenes were shot at a specially-constructed village on Catalina Island. Over one hundred Polynesians were used.

The film was shot in color at a time when that was rare.

Paramount took up Farmer's option after she made the film.

== See also ==
- South Seas genre
