= The Ebb-Tide =

1894 novella by Robert Louis Stevenson and Lloyd Osbourne

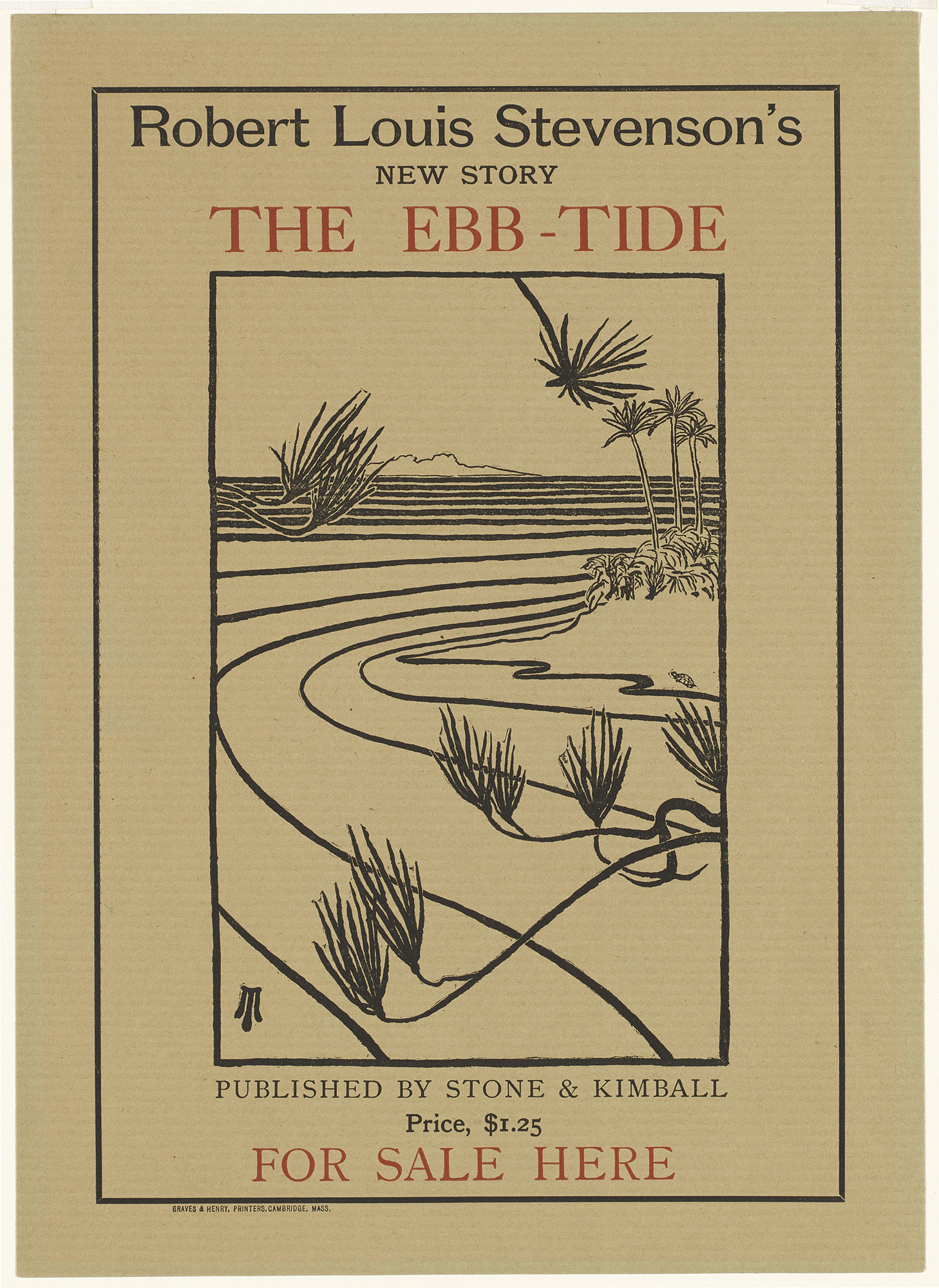
- Poster for the first US printing (1894)
- Author: Robert Louis Stevenson; Lloyd Osbourne
- Language: English
- Genre: Adventure fiction, novella
- Publisher: Heinemann (UK); Smith & Kimball (US)
- Publication date: 1894
- Publication place: Scotland
- Media type: Print (Hardback)
- Text: The Ebb-Tide at Wikisource

The Ebb-Tide. A Trio and a Quartette is an 1894 novella written by Robert Louis Stevenson and his stepson Lloyd Osbourne. It was published the year Stevenson died.

== Plot ==
Three beggars operate in the port of Papeete on Tahiti. They are Herrick, a failed English businessman; Davis, an American sea captain disgraced by the loss of his last ship; and Huish, a dishonest Cockney of various employments.

One day an off-course schooner carrying a cargo of champagne from San Francisco to Sydney arrives in port, its officers having been killed by smallpox. With no one else willing to risk infection, the U.S. consul employs Davis to take over the ship for the remainder of its voyage. Davis brings the other two men, along with a plan to steal the ship and navigate it to Peru, where they will sell the cargo and vessel and disappear with the money.

Once at sea, Davis and Huish start drinking the cargo and spend almost all of their time intoxicated. Herrick, whose conscience is severely troubled by the plan but feels he has no other way to escape poverty, is left alone to manage the ship and three native crew members, despite having no seafaring experience.

Several days later the would-be thieves discover they have been victims of a fraud: most of the cargo is not champagne but merely bottles of water. Evidently the shipper and the previous captain had intended to sink the ship deliberately and claim the full value of the "champagne" on insurance.

Now sober, Davis discovers that his rushed preparations and drunkenness leave the ship with insufficient food to reach Peru. The only port they can reach without starving is Papeete, where they would surely be imprisoned for their actions.

They sight an unknown island, where they discover an upper-class Englishman named Attwater. Attwater, a devout Christian, has been harvesting pearls here for many years with the help of several dozen native workers, all except four of whom have recently also died of smallpox.

The three men hatch a new plan to kill Attwater and take his pearls, but Herrick's guilt-stricken demeanour and Huish's drunken ramblings soon betray them. Attwater and his servants force them back onto the ship at gunpoint. Unable to live with himself, Herrick jumps overboard and tries to drown himself. Failing even in this, he swims to the shore and throws himself on Attwater's mercy.

The next day, Huish proposes a final plan which shocks even the unscrupulous Davis: they will go to meet Attwater under a flag of truce, and Huish will disable him by throwing acid in his face. Attwater is suspicious, realises what is going on, and forces Huish to fatally spread the vitriol on himself. Attwater threatens to kill Davis as well, but forgives him and tells him, "Go, and sin no more."

Two weeks later, the surviving men prepare to leave the island as Attwater's own ship approaches. Davis is now repentant and fervently religious to an almost crazed degree, and he urges the atheist Herrick to join him in his faith.

== Analysis ==
The lengthy voyage of the stolen ship has been described as "a microcosm of imperialist society, directed by greedy but incompetent whites, the labour supplied by long-suffering natives who fulfil their duties without orders and are true to the missionary faith which the Europeans make no pretence of respecting".

The strange and memorable character of Attwater, ruthlessly violent while talking always of Jesus' forgiveness, who alternately repels and fascinates the other characters, reflects Stevenson's own conflicted feelings about Christianity.

== Adaptations ==
The novella was adapted into the films Ebb Tide (1922), Ebb Tide (1937), and Adventure Island (1947), Le Reflux (film) (1965), as well as a 1959 episode of ITV Play of the Week and a 1998 television film starring Robbie Coltrane.

== Reception ==
=== Contemporary reception ===
The Ebb-Tide met with a mixed response upon its serialization in To-Day (November 1893 – February 1894) and its subsequent book publication in 1894. Critics who had enthusiastically championed Stevenson's earlier adventure fiction were often unsettled by the novella's unrelenting grimness and its departure from the romance conventions his readers expected. The writer and critic Israel Zangwill, who had championed Stevenson's work, felt moved to publish a notable defence of the novella in 1894, suggesting that its hostile reception among some reviewers warranted a rebuttal. The collaboration with Lloyd Osbourne was noted approvingly by The Times, which remarked that Osbourne had proved "a collaborator whose methods and literary talents are closely akin to his own."

Stevenson himself was famously ambivalent about the completed work. In a letter written from Vailima in 1893 he referred to it as "the ever-to-be-execrated Ebb Tide, or Stevenson's Blooming Error," expressing relief at having finally finished the manuscript. Despite this self-deprecation, Stevenson had labored intensively over the text, repeatedly revising chapters he considered inadequate; the composition of the novella's final sections has been compared, only partly in jest, to Flaubert's notorious perfectionism.

=== Later critical reputation ===
Despite its initially uncertain reception, The Ebb-Tide attracted admiration from a number of significant later literary figures. Jorge Luis Borges, one of Stevenson's most devoted readers, singled it out for particular praise, calling it "a very fine book" and observing that it anticipated the manner of Joseph Conrad: "It's very much like Conrad. It is. And it came before Conrad." Borges further noted that Conrad had evidently known Stevenson's works thoroughly.

The comparison with Conrad has recurred in modern criticism. The figure of Attwater — an imperious Englishman who governs a remote Pacific atoll with a combination of ruthless violence and evangelical Christianity — has frequently been compared to Kurtz in Conrad's Heart of Darkness (1899), a work written some five years after The Ebb-Tide. Commentators have argued that Stevenson's characterization anticipates Conrad's exploration of the moral corruption attending colonial power.

The novella's posthumous critical standing was also hampered by broader trends in Stevenson's reputation. During the early twentieth century, when modernist critics tended to dismiss Stevenson as a popular entertainer for juveniles, The Ebb-Tide remained largely overlooked. It was only with the rehabilitation of Stevenson's late Pacific writings from the 1980s onward that the novella's distinctive qualities came to be more fully appreciated.

=== Modern scholarly reception ===
Contemporary scholarship has tended to read The Ebb-Tide as one of Stevenson's most significant literary achievements and as a work that sits uneasily within the genre of colonial adventure fiction it superficially resembles. Roslyn Jolly's edition for Oxford University Press (1996) emphasizes the novella's ironic and critical treatment of British and American imperialism in the South Pacific, noting the contrast it draws between the moral bankruptcy of its white European protagonists and the dignity of the Polynesian characters they exploit. Scholars have argued that Stevenson's Pacific fiction, including The Ebb-Tide, represents some of the most critical engagements with imperialism in nineteenth-century English literature, anticipating themes more commonly associated with twentieth-century postcolonial writing.

The novella's style has also attracted critical attention. Encyclopædia Britannica described it as "a grim and powerful tale written in a dispassionate style," while one early commentator, quoted in The Penguin Encyclopedia of Horror and the Supernatural, wrote that the climactic chapters were so atmospherically effective that one "does not so much read the last few chapters as feel them crawling up one's spine." Scholarship has also explored the novella's dense classical allusiveness: The Ebb-Tide contains no fewer than ten references to or quotations from Virgil's Aeneid, a work Stevenson revered, and critics have argued that the text functions as a sustained revision of the Aeneid's foundational narrative of empire — one that, in Stevenson's retelling, serves to discredit rather than glorify the imperial project.

== Bibliography ==
- Balderston, Daniel (1999). "Interviews with Borges". Variaciones Borges. 8: 1–20.
- Balfour, Graham (1901). The Life of Robert Louis Stevenson. London: Methuen.
- Jolly, Roslyn, ed. (1996). South Sea Tales. Oxford World's Classics. Introduction by Roslyn Jolly. Oxford: Oxford University Press.
- Laplace-Sinatra, Michel (2013). "Stevenson's The Ebb-Tide, or Virgil's Aeneid Revisited: How Literature May Make or Mar Empires". Études anglaises. 66 (3): 259–278.
- Price, David, ed. (1908). Vailima Letters: Being Correspondence Addressed by Robert Louis Stevenson to Sidney Colvin, November 1890-October 1894. London: Methuen.
- Sandison, Alan (1996). Robert Louis Stevenson and the Appearance of Modernism. London: Macmillan.
- Sullivan, Jack, ed. (1986). The Penguin Encyclopedia of Horror and the Supernatural. New York: Viking.
- "[Review of The Ebb-Tide]". The Times. 1894.
- Zangwill, Israel (1894). "Robert Louis Stevenson's The Ebb-Tide". To-Day.
