= Ebbing and Flowing Spring =

Spring in Tennessee, USA

Coordinates: 36°25′32″N 82°57′19″W

The spring is located about two miles from downtown Rogersville.

Ebbing and Flowing Spring is a spring located in Hawkins County, Tennessee, near Rogersville, that is one of only two known springs in the world to exhibit tidal characteristics.

== Description ==
The spring is located on land that once belonged to Colonel Thomas Amis, father-in-law of Rogersville's founder, Joseph Rogers. It is referred to as "Sinking Spring" in a land grant given to Amis by the General Assembly of North Carolina for his services during the American Revolution. Amis settled the area in around 1780. His fort-like house is a few tenths of a mile from the spring.

Ebbing and Flowing Spring is one of only two known springs in the world to exhibit tidal characteristics with a predictable regularity.

During a period of 2 hours and 47 minutes, the spring's flow ranges from an indiscernible trickle to 500 US gallons (1,900 L; 420 imp gal) per minute. The water in Ebbing and Flowing Spring maintains a constant temperature of 34 °F (1 °C).

== Local legend ==
The spring was credited with having extraordinary powers in matters of the heart by the citizens of nearby Rogersville. Townspeople claimed that any couple drinking from the spring at the peak of its flow would marry within the year. Some legends suggest that the spring's power was first discovered by Rogersville founder Joseph Rogers, who was said to have drunk from the spring with his beloved, Mary Amis, who soon after became his wife, despite her father's initial disapproval.

== Visiting the spring ==
The spring is privately owned by descendants of Thomas Amis, but it is open to the public. Local tourism agencies maintain directions and brochures about the spring. The property is now owned by Orphia Gibbs.
