= Ken Ebb =

Australian rugby league footballer

Playing information
- Position: Lock
Club
Years	Team	Pld	T	G	FG	P
1989–92	Cronulla-Sutherland	27	2	0	0	8

Ken Ebb is an Australian former professional rugby league footballer who played for Cronulla-Sutherland.

Ebb, an Engadine Dragons junior, played first-grade with Cronulla from 1989 to 1992. In his first two seasons he played off the bench whenever he broke into first-grade, then in 1991 and 1992 he made several appearance as starting lock.
