= Emil Horneman =

Danish composer (1809-1870)

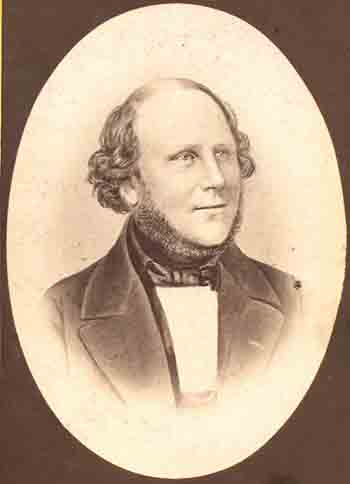

Johan Ole Emil Horneman (May 13, 1809 – May 29, 1870) was a Danish composer.

He was born in Copenhagen, a son of miniature painter Christian Horneman. Despite his talent for drawing, Christian encouraged him to study music. He was taught by his father and later by Danish pianist and composer Friedrich Kuhlau.

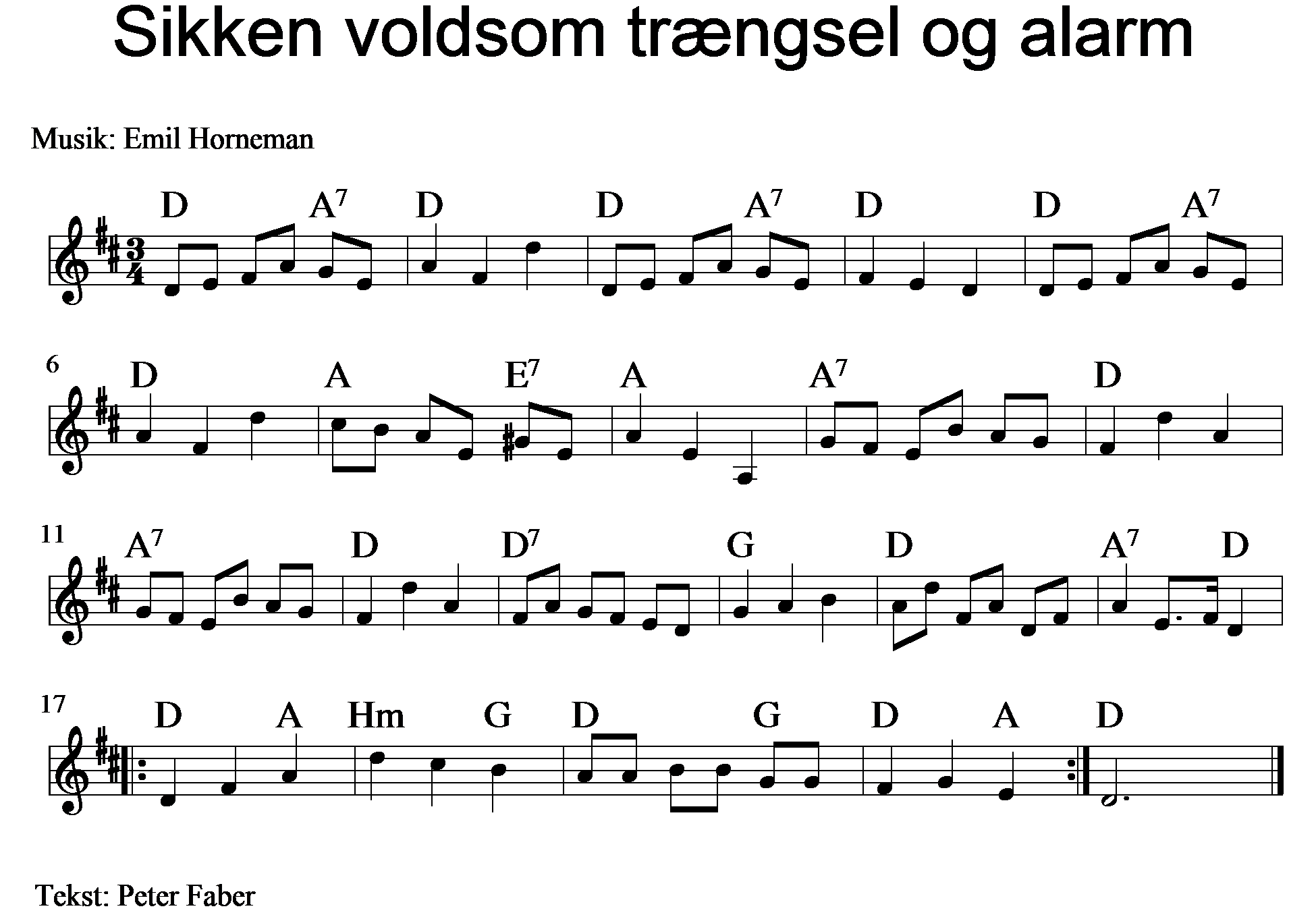

In 1837, he was appointed piano teacher at the Royal Academy of Music. In 1842, he published '12 Caprices for Pianoforte' (Op. 1), which was praised by Robert Schumann. Most of his music is piano pieces or songs.

Emil's son C.F.E. Horneman also became a composer. He became a good friend to Edvard Grieg while both were students at Leipzig Conservatory.

== See also ==
- List of Danish composers
