= C. F. E. Horneman =

Danish composer, conductor and music publisher (1840-1906)

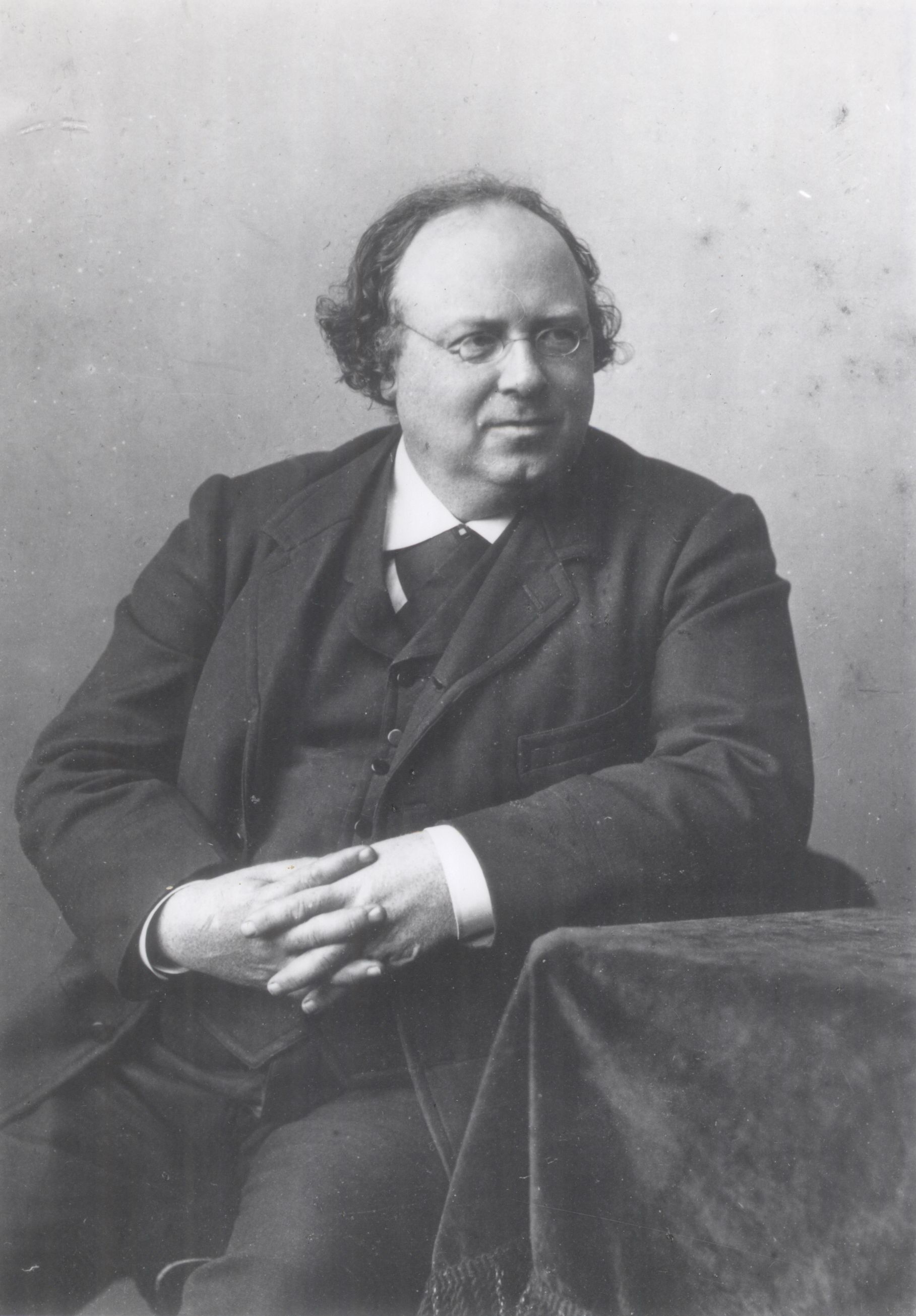
C.F.E. Horneman

Christian Frederik Emil Horneman (December 17, 1840 – June 8, 1906) was a Danish composer, conductor, music publisher, and music instructor.

== Biography ==
C. F. E. Horneman was born in Copenhagen, the son of the composer Emil Horneman and of Camilla Scheuermann (a cousin of composer Emma Hartmann). He studied at the Leipzig Conservatory with Ignaz Moscheles, Ernst Friedrich Richter, Moritz Hauptmann, and Julius Rietz. After his return to Denmark he composed divertimenti and opera fantasies and began work on the opera Aladdin, the composition of which occupied him for more than twenty years. The overture, completed in 1864, is Horneman's best known work, along with the four-movement suite drawn from incidental music for the Holger Drachmann drama Gurre.

Together with composers Gottfred Matthison-Hansen, Edvard Grieg, and others he founded in 1865 the music institute Euterpe to encourage newer Danish music. This was in reaction to the Music Society (Musikforeningen), which was controlled by Niels Wilhelm Gade and was regarded by the younger composers as too conservative. Horneman conducted the organization's concerts.

During a trip to Germany in 1867 he wrote his Ouverture héroïque and led a performance of his Aladdin Overture at the Leipzig Gewandhaus. In 1874, together with Otto Malling, he founded the Concert Association (Koncertforeningen) and in 1879 the Horneman music conservatory (Hornemans Konservatorium) that bore his name until its closing in 1920.

== Partial list of works ==
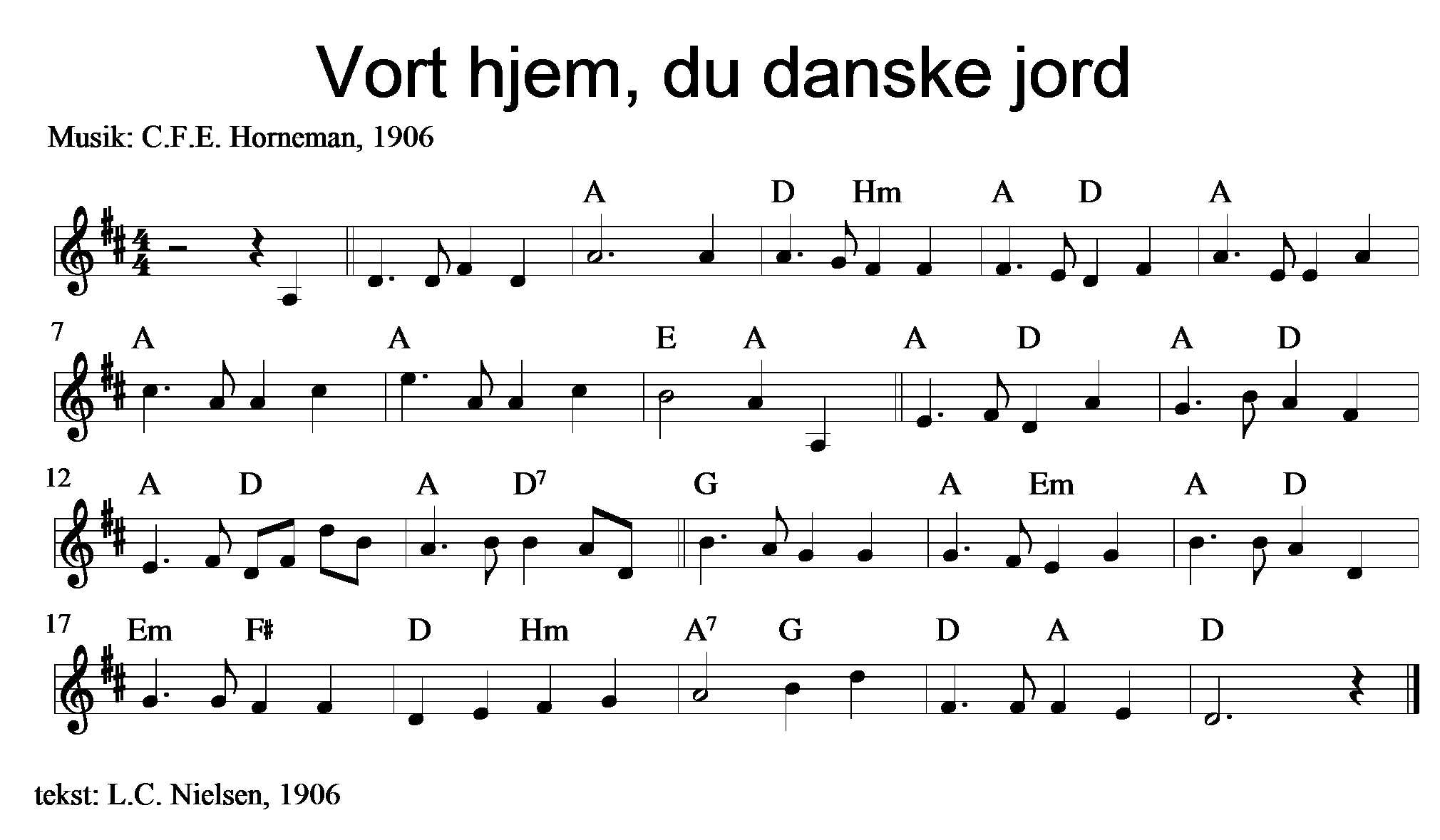

Opera

Aladdin (first performed 19 Nov 1888)

Incidental music

Esther (H. Drachmann) (1889)
The Judge of Zalamea (P. Calderón) (1892)
The Barber of Seville (Beaumarchais) (1893)
King Hjarne Skjald (K. Gjellerup) (1893)
Gurre (Drachmann) (1901)
The Conversion of Harlekin (Rode) (1901)
Kalanus (Paludan-Müller) (1904)
The Fight against the Muses (Gjellerup) (1908–10)

Vocal

Valfarten (Pilgrimage) for baritone and orchestra (1876)
Lyric Suite for solo voice, chorus, and orchestra (1878)
3 Uhland Songs for baritone, male choir, and orchestra (1889)
Cantata for the opening of Tivoli Concert Hall (1902)
Cantata for the centenary of J.P.E. Hartmann (1905)
Cantata for the death of King Christian IX (1906)
52 songs, 8 duets

Instrumental

Ouverture héroïque (1867)
String Quartet no. 1 in G minor (1859)
String Quartet no. 2 in D major (1861)
Fantasia for piano
Serenade for piano

== See also ==
- List of Danish composers
