= Christian Hersleb Horneman =

Norwegian politician

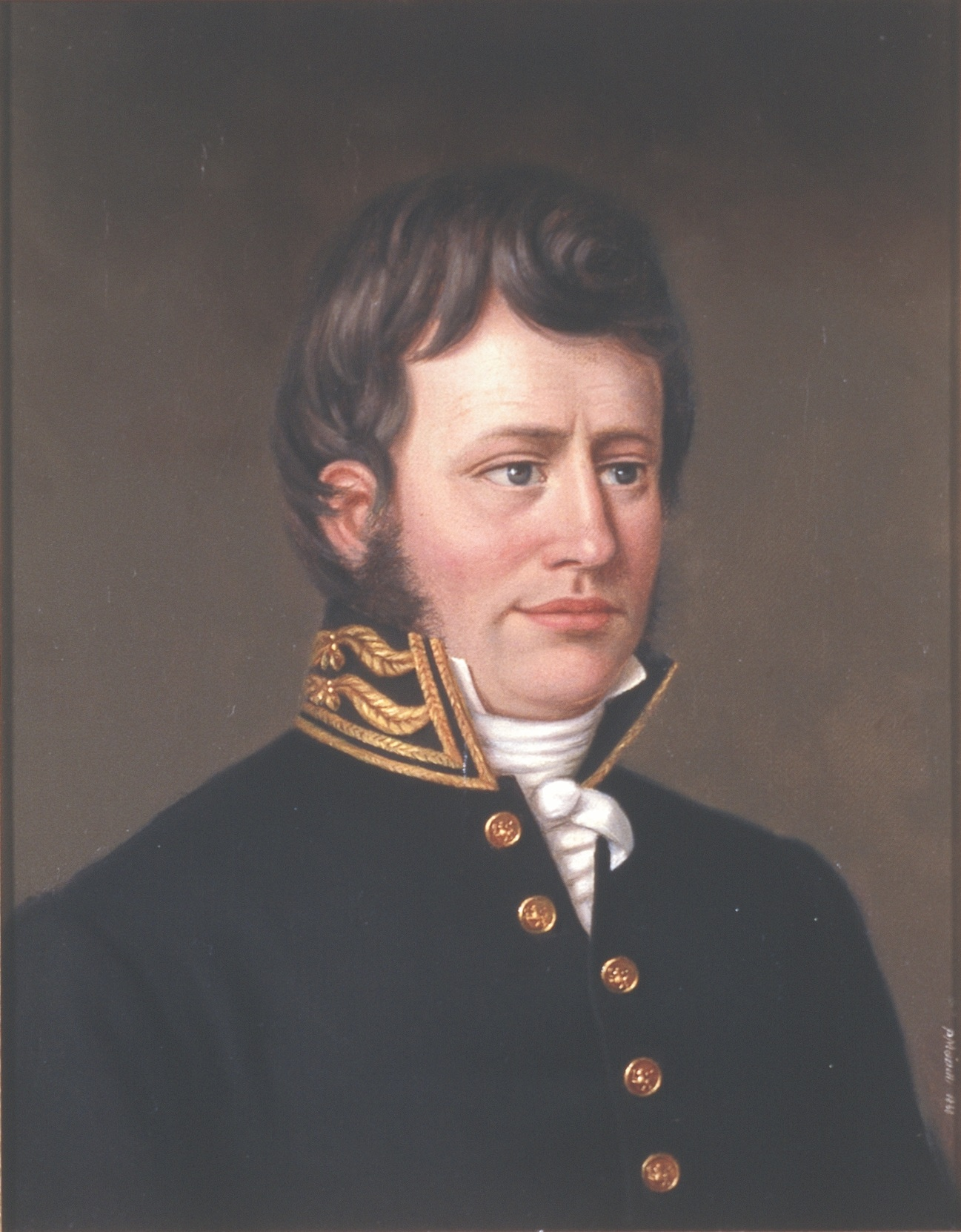
- Born: 10 December 1781; Trondheim, Norway
- Died: 22 June 1860 (aged 78)
- Occupations: Jurist; Politician

Christian Hersleb Horneman (10 December 1781 – 22 June 1860) was a Norwegian jurist and elected official. He served as a representative at the Norwegian Constitutional Assembly.

Christian Hersleb Horneman was born in Trondheim, Norway. He attended Trondheim Cathedral School. In 1801, Horneman earned his Cand. Jur. from the University of Copenhagen. He served as an auditor in Helsingor and at Kronborg Castle. In 1810 he was appointed magistrate and town clerk in Kragerø in Telemark. In 1815, Horneman returned to Trondheim where he served as an assessor for the court over the next forty years. He also served as chairman of the supervisory board of Norges Bank from 1832 to 1848.

He represented Kragerø at the Norwegian Constituent Assembly in 1814 where he voted with the independence party (Selvstendighetspartiet). He was elected to the Parliament of Norway, representing Trondheim in 1824, 1827, 1830, 1836 and 1839.

He was married during 1810 with his cousin Fredrikke Horneman (1787-1852) with whom he had nine children. He was a member and later president of the Royal Norwegian Society of Sciences and Letters. He also served as mayor Trondheim.

== Related Reading ==
- Holme Jørn (2014) De kom fra alle kanter - Eidsvollsmennene og deres hus (Oslo: Cappelen Damm) ISBN 978-82-02-44564-5
