= Ríos =

- Language: Galician, Spanish, Portuguese, French, Dutch, Italian

Origin
- Region of origin: Galician, Spanish, Portuguese, French, Dutch, Italian

Rios, Ríos or Riós are Galician, Portuguese, and Spanish surnames. The name has numerous origins. In Germany, Italy, France, UK, and the Americas the Ríos surname can also be found in the surname history books. The name was derived from the Spanish word "Rio," which means "river" (pronounced: Ree-Oess). The surname Ríos is a rich sign of ancestry which includes royals and nobles. Historians believe the Ríos family derived from the Royal House of Asturias and King Liuvigilds Dynasty.

The original bearer of the name Ríos, which is a local surname, once lived, held land, or was born in the region of Northwestern Spain which is today's Galicia and Asturias. In the Middle Ages, names originally denoted the proprietorship of the village or estate. The Ríos Family originally lived near a river. As early as the 10th Century, the Ríos family has been involved in politics, business, military, Christianity, athletics, music, education, science, law, medicine, arts, architecture, literature, technology, inventions, mathematics, engineering and economic investments.

Valid historical, orthographic and prepositional variants of the Ríos surname include:

- Standard and regional accent forms: Ríos, Rios, Riós, Rius, Rieu, Rive, Rivus, Rivers, Riu, Río, Ria, Rial, Rio, Riou, Ros
- Prepositional and artical prefixes: de los Ríos, de los Rios, del Río, del Rio, de Ríos, de Rios, los Ríos, da Rios, O’Rios, d’Reux, Reus, do Rios
- Archaic and historical spellings: Rixos, Rioux, Riox, Rioz

== People with the name ==
- Anhelo Hernández Ríos (1922–2010), Uruguayan plastic artist and teacher
- Ángel Luis Ríos Matos (born 1956), is a bishop of the Diocese of Mayagüez in Puerto Rico since 2020
- Alfonso Bernardo de los Ríos y Guzmán (1626–1692), Roman Catholic prelate and Archbishop of Granada
- Adolfo Morales de los Ríos (1868–1928), Spanish architect, urban planner and historian
- Abelardo Ríos (born 1952), Colombian cyclist
- Adolfo Ríos (born 1966), Mexico National Team goalkeeper
- Alberto Ríos (born 1952), American academic, author and poet
- Alex Ríos (born 1981), Puerto Rican baseball player
- Alexei Rios (born 1987), Belarusian footballer
- Ana María Sánchez de Ríos (born 1959), Peruvian diplomat
- Anabel Rodríguez Ríos (born 1977), Venezuelan film director and screenwriter
- Andrés Castro Ríos (1942–2006), Puerto Rican poet
- Andrés Ríos (born 1989), Argentine footballer
- Ángel Fernández de los Ríos (1821–1880), Spanish politician, writer, educator, and historian
- Andrés Monche y Ríos (1865–1917), road, canal and port engineer
- Antonella Ríos (born 1974), Chilean television and film actress
- Antonio de los Ríos y Rosas (1812–1873), Spanish politician
- Antonio Alonso Ríos (1887–1980), Spanish teacher, writer and politician
- Antonio Ríos (born 1988), Mexican footballer
- Ariel Rios (1954–1982), ATF agent
- Armando Ríos (born 1971), Puerto Rican baseball player
- Armando Ríos Piter (born 1973), Mexican politician who currently serves as a senator and ran for president in 2018
- Britt Rios-Ellis (born 1962), American academic administrator
- Bernardo Ríos (born 1959) Colombian artist
- Bernardo Giner de los Ríos (1888–1970), Spanish architect, politician, and writer of architectural books
- Birmania Ríos, American television journalist
- Blanca de los Ríos (1862–1956), Spanish writer and painter
- Bobby Ríos (born 1957), Puerto Rican basketball player
- Brandon Ríos (born 1986), American boxer
- Carlos José Gutiérrez de los Ríos (1742–1795), Spanish aristocrat, 6th Count of Fernán Núñez
- Carlos Gutiérrez de los Ríos (1779–1822), Spanish noble and diplomat
- Carlos Jose Pareja Rios (born 1950), Peruvian diplomat
- Carlos Torres Ríos (1898–1956), Argentine cinematographer, film director, screenwriter, film editor and film producer
- Carmelo Ríos (disambiguation), multiple people
- Catalina de los Ríos y Lisperguer (1604–1665), aristocratic 17th-century Chilean landowner, nicknamed La Quintrala
- Christopher Rios (1971–2000), American rapper
- Claudia Ríos (born 1992), is a Mexican female volleyball player
- Carmelo Ríos (athlete) (1959–2022), Puerto Rican long-distance runner
- Carmelo Ríos Santiago (born 1973), Puerto Rican politician
- Conchi Ríos (born 1991), Spanish bullfighter
- Conrado Ríos Gallardo (1896–1983), Chilean diplomat and journalist
- Danny Rios (born 1972), American baseball player
- Darren Ríos (born 1995), Puerto Rican footballer
- Darwin Ríos (born 1991), Bolivian footballer
- David Ríos Insua (born 1964), Spanish mathematician
- Diego de los Ríos (1850–1911), Royal Spanish Governor-General of the Philippines
- Diego Valades Ríos (born 1945), Mexican lawyer, jurist, and politician
- Domingo Terán de los Ríos (born XVII century-1701), served as the first governor of Texas from 1691 to 1692
- Narciso Heredia y Begines de los Ríos (1775–1847), Spanish noble, politician, and diplomat
- Elena Rios (born 1955), American physician and public health advocate
- Edda de los Ríos (1942–2007), Paraguayan actress and teacher
- Eddie Rios Mellado (1930–2009), inventor of basketball's three-point-line
- Edwin Rios (born 1994), Puerto Rican baseball player
- Efraín Ríos Montt (1926–2018), 26th President of Guatemala
- Elvira Ríos (1913–1987), Mexican singer and actress
- Emily Rios (born 1989), American actress and model
- Emilia Ríos (born 1988), Chilean politician who currently serves as mayor of Ñuñoa
- Emilio Botín-Sanz de Sautuola y García de los Ríos (1934-2014), marquess of O'Shea, Spanish billionaire banker
- Emma Ríos (born 1976) Spanish comics artist and illustrator
- Enrique Cornelio Osornio Martínez de los Ríos (1868–1945), Mexican politician and military surgeon
- Ernesto Ríos (born 1975), Mexican new media artist and academic
- Eulalio Ríos Alemán (1935–1980), Mexican swimmer
- Eugenio Montero Ríos (1832–1914) Spanish Prime Minister and President of the Senate of Spain
- Eusebio Ríos (1935–2008), Spanish footballer and manager
- Evette Rios, American lifestyle expert, writer and television host
- Fabiana Ríos (born 1964), Argentine politician
- Fernando de los Ríos (1879–1949), Spanish Minister of Justice, Minister of State, and politician
- Felipe Ríos (born 1992), Chilean tennis player
- Filiberto Ojeda Ríos (1933–2005), Puerto Rican separatist
- Fabian Rios (actor) (born 1980), Colombian actor and model
- Fabián Ríos (politician) (born 1964), Argentine politician
- Fernando de los Ríos Urutti (1879–1949), Spanish professor and politician
- Francisco Gutiérrez de los Ríos (1644-1721), Spanish nobleman, diplomat, and writer
- Francisco Ríos, Mexican baseball pitcher
- Francisco Giner de los Rios (1839–1915), Spanish philosopher and educator
- Francesco de Los Rios (1689-1775), Belgium-born German count and field marshal
- García de Medrano y Álvarez de los Ríos (1604–1683), Spanish nobleman, statesman and jurist
- Gabriel Ríos (born 1978), Belgian singer
- Genoveva Ríos (1865–?), Bolivian hero
- Gloria Ríos (1928–2002), American singer
- Gonzálo Ríos (born 1992), Argentine footballer
- Gonzalo Güell y Morales de los Ríos (1895–1985), Cuban politician and diplomat
- Guido Manini Ríos (born 1958), Uruguayan politician and retired military general
- Guillermo Ríos Alcalá, Mexican restoration expert and educator
- Héctor Ríos Ereñú (1930–2017), Argentine military officer and Chief of Defense Staff
- Hernando de los Ríos Coronel (1559–1621?), mathematician, cosmographer, cartographer, navigator, naval pilot, administrator, soldier, priest, advocate (Procurator General) at the Spanish court of the inhabitants of The Philippines
- José Ignacio Gregorio Comonfort de los Ríos (1812–1863), 25th President of Mexico
- Jacobo Rios Rodriguez, international law scholar
- Jaime Rios (boxer), Panamanian boxer
- Jaime Rios (judge), American judge
- Jaime Ríos (rower), Spanish rower
- Jansen Rios (born 1991), Filipino basketball player
- José Rios (born 1974), Spanish runner
- José Amador de los Ríos (1818–1878), Spanish intellectual, historian and archaeologist
- Josef de Mendoza y Ríos (1761–1816), Spanish astronomer and mathematician
- Juan Cancel Ríos (1925–1992), Puerto Rican politician and senator
- Juan Ríos (baseball) (1942–1995), Puerto Rican baseball player
- Juan Ríos (actor) (born 1972), Mexican television actor
- Julián Ríos (born 1941), Spanish writer
- Julio Ríos Gallego (born 1973), Colombian engineer, lecturer, mentor, professor of Mathematics and Physics
- Julio García Fernández de los Ríos (1894–1969), Spanish horse rider
- Kevin Ríos (born 1993), Colombian cyclist
- Lalo Rios (1927–1973), Mexican-born American actor
- Leonel Rios (born 1983), Argentine footballer
- Leopoldo Torres Ríos (1899–1960), Argentine film director and screenwriter
- Lucas Rios Marques (born 1988), or simply Lucas, Brazilian footballer
- Luisa Martel de los Ríos (1535–1593) conqueror of the Americas
- Juan Antonio Ríos (1888–1946), Chilean lawyer, political figure and 24th President of Chile
- Luigi Sante Da Rios (1881–1965), Italian mathematician and physicist
- Luigi da Rios (1843–1892), Italian painter
- Luis de la Cruz y Ríos (1776–1853), Spanish painter
- Luz Rios, Mexican-born American pop singer and songwriter
- Martin Rios (curler) (born 1981), Swiss curler
- Master of Calamarca, real name José López de los Ríos; 18th century), artist
- Manu Ríos (born 1998), known professionally as Manu Ríos, Spanish actor, model and singer
- María Lorenza de los Ríos (1761–1821) Marquise of Fuerte-Híjar, poet, and playwright
- Manuel de Godoy y Álvarez de Faria Ríos (1767-1851) Prince of Spain, 1st Duke of Alcudia, 1st Duke of Sueca, 1st Secretary of State, 1st Baron of Mascalbo
- María Francisca de Silva y Gutiérrez de los Ríos, 11th Duchess of the Infantado (1707–1770), Spanish noblewoman
- Marcelo Ríos (born 1975), Chilean tennis player
- Margarita Ríos Farjat (born 1973), lawyer, poet, and jurist
- María Fernanda Ríos (born 1982), Ecuadorian entertainer
- Mariana Rios (born 1985), Brazilian actress and singer
- Mariá Álvarez Rios (1919–2010), Cuban composer, pianist and educator
- María Eugenia Ríos (1935–2024), Mexican actress from the Mexican Golden Age Era of Cinema
- Portrait de la marquise de Santiago (Doña María de la Soledad de los Ríos) (1764-1807), Rich noble and Marquise of Santiago
- Mario Enrique Ríos Montt (1932–2026), Guatemalan prelate of the Roman Catholic Church, human rights activist
- Marcos Rios (born 1999), Argentinian kickboxer
- Mark Rios (born 1987) Spanish artist and fashion designer
- Marlene Dobkin de Rios (1939–2012), American cultural anthropologist, medical anthropologist, and psychotherapist
- Marleyda Soto Ríos (born 1977), Colombian actress
- Marquesado de Santiago, Spanish noble title given to Francisco Esteban Rodríguez de los Ríos
- Martín Ríos (born 1979), Argentine serial and mass shooter
- Michael Ríos (born 1985), Chilean footballer
- Miguel Ríos (born 1944), Spanish singer
- Nora Rios (born 1999), Swedish actress
- Osvaldo Ríos (born 1960), Puerto Rican actor and model
- Pascual Navarro Ríos (born 1960), is a Spanish diplomat who currently serves as Ambassador of Spain to Germany since 2024
- Pedro Ríos (born 1981), Spanish former professional footballer
- Drummer boy of Tacuarí (Pedro Ríos) (1798–1811), boy soldier who was killed in action while encouraging the troops at the battle of Tacuari
- Pedro de los Ríos y Gutiérrez de Aguayo (died 1547), Royal Spanish governor of Castilla del Oro
- Pedro de los Ríos (died 1563–1565), Domician missionary in Mexico in the mid-16th century, to whom the Codex Ríos is attributed.
- Pedro Manini Ríos (1879–1958), Uruguayan politician, lawyer, and journalist
- Pedro Antonio Ríos Reyna (1905–1971), Venezuelan classical musician
- La Pola (Policarpa Salavarrieta Ríos) (1795-1817), She is a heroine of the independence of Colombia
- Rafael Morgan Ríos (born 1970), Mexican politician
- Rafael Ríos Rey (1911–1980), Puerto Rican muralist
- Raúl Ríos (born 1993), Puerto Rican sailor
- Rebecca Rios (born 1967), American politician
- René Ríos Boettiger (1911–2000), also known as Pepo, Chilean cartoonist, creator of the character Condorito
- Ricardo de los Ríos (1846–1929), Spanish painter, engraver, etcher and illustrator
- Ricardo Castro Rios (1920–2001), Spanish-Argentine film actor
- Richard Ríos (born 2000), Colombian footballer
- Rodrigo Ríos Lozano (born 1990) commonly known as Rodri, Spanish footballer
- Roberto Álvarez Ríos (1932–2015), Cuban artist
- Roberto Ríos (born 1971), Spanish footballer
- Rocío Ríos (born 1969), Spanish long-distance runner
- Rodrigo Ríos (born 1977), Chilean footballer
- Rodrigo Amador de los Ríos (1849–1917), He was a lawyer, archaeologist and historian
- Rosa María Ortiz Ríos (1955–2020), Peruvian lawyer and politician who served as Minister of Energy and Mines
- Rosa Rios (born 1965), 43rd Treasurer of the United States. American academic, and businesswoman
- Rossana de los Ríos (born 1975), Paraguayan tennis player
- Ronny Rios (born 1990), Mexican-American boxer
- Saturio Ríos (1846–1920), He was a painter, inventor and telegraph operator
- Sixto Pondal Ríos (1907–1968), Argentine screenwriter, poet, and dramatist
- Sixto Ríos (1913–2008), Spanish mathematician
- Tere Ríos (1917–1999), American writer
- Victor Arriagada Rios (1934–2012), Chilean cartoonist
- Victor Rios (born 1978), is a professor, author, and speaker
- Vicente Gutiérrez de los Ríos y Gálvez (1732–1779)
- Willie Ríos (born 1949), Puerto Rican middle-distance runner
- Waldo de los Rios (1934–1977), Argentine composer, conductor and arranger
- Yacksel Ríos (born 1993), Puerto Rican baseball player
- Yolanda Ríos (1951–2012), Venezuelan-Spanish actress
- Zury Ríos (born 1968), Guatemalan politician

== See also ==
- Ariel Rios Federal Building, in the neighborhood of Washington, DC, is the headquarters of the United States Bureau of Alcohol, Tobacco, Firearms and Explosives (ATF)
- Los Rios District, the oldest continually occupied neighborhood in the state of California
- Rios, Texas, an unincorporated community in Duval County, Texas
- Juan José Ríos, Sinaloa, a city in Northern Sinaloa, Mexico
- Entre Ríos Province, Argentina
- Coto Ríos, a village in the northeastern part of Jaén Province, Spain
- Rios-Caledonia Adobe, a California Historical Landmark and on the National Register of Historic Places
- Dos Rios (disambiguation)
- Dos Rios State Park Dos Rios Ranch is in California's Central Valley
- Palace of los Ríos y Salcedo, a palace located in Soria, Spain
- Ríos Rosas (Madrid), a neighborhood of Madrid belonging to the district of Chamberí, named for Antonio de los Ríos Rosas
- Riós, a municipality in the Spanish province of Ourense, in the autonomous community of Galicia
- Codex Ríos, an Italian translation and augmentation of a Spanish colonial-era manuscript, Codex Telleriano-Remensis
- Los Ríos (disambiguation)
- Rio (disambiguation)
- Del Rio (disambiguation)
- Riario Noble family
- House of Reuss Noble Family
