= List of second-generation mathematicians =

Math ability is passed from parent to child with the most famous example being the Bernoulli family. This second generation phenomenon also holds in physics but in that field the Nobel Prize in Physics gives a tool for tracking it, since it has been given out for more than 120 years, and there are on average more than two Nobel Prizes in Physics given each year. There is no comparable award in mathematics but perusing (for example) the MacTutor History of Mathematics Archive list of biographies enables the construction of a similar list of notable two-generation pairs of mathematicians.

The following is a list of parent-child pairs who both made contributions to mathematics significant enough to be noted in the citation for a prestigious prize, in an obituary in a major math journal, or in a similarly authoritative source. All are father-son except for Emmy Noether, Marie-Hélène Schwartz and Cathleen Morawetz. The list is in chronological order by birth date of the parent.

== List ==
Parent	Contributions	Recognition	Child	Contributions	Recognition
Johann Bernoulli	L'Hôpital's rule Catenary; Brachistochrone curve		Daniel Bernoulli	Bernoulli's principle Gamma function	
Jacopo Riccati	Riccati equation		Vincenzo Riccati	Introduction of hyperbolic functions	
Giulio Carlo de' Toschi di Fagnano	Discovery of addition and multiplication formulas for arcs of lemniscate		Giovanni Fagnano	Fagnano's problem	
Farkas Bolyai	Wallace–Bolyai–Gerwien theorem		János Bolyai	Non-Euclidean geometry	
Elie Cartan	Structure of Lie groups Exterior algebra Moving frame	Leconte Prize; Lobachevsky Prize	Henri Cartan	Cartan's theorems A and B Projective module	Émile Picard Medal; Wolf Prize
Max Noether	Brill–Noether theory Noether's formula Noether inequality	Obituary in Proceedings of the LMS	Emmy Noether	Noether's theorem Noetherian Property	Obituary Letter in New York Times
Frank Morley	Morley's trisector theorem	Obituary in Nature	Frank Vigor Morley	Inversive Geometry (1933)	
Stanisław Zaremba	Mathematical analysis		Stanisław Krystyn Zaremba	Low-discrepancy sequences	
George David Birkhoff	Ergodic Theorem	Bocher Memorial Prize	Garrett Birkhoff	Universal algebra	George David Birkhoff Prize
Paul Lévy	Lévy process	Émile Picard Medal	Marie-Hélène Schwartz		Tribute in La Gazette des mathématiciens
J. L. Synge	Synge's theorem	Boyle Medal; Henry Marshall Tory Medal	Cathleen Morawetz	Equations of mixed type Local energy decay	Leroy P. Steele Prize
Emil Artin	Solved Hilbert's 17th problem Partially solved Hilbert's 9th problem	Obituary in the Bulletin of the AMS	Michael Artin	Artin approximation theorem Algebraic spaces	Leroy P. Steele Prize; Wolf Prize
Petr Novikov	Word problem for groups	Lenin Prize	Sergei Novikov	Adams–Novikov spectral sequence Surgery theory	Fields Medal
Magnus Hestenes	Optimal control	Guggenheim Fellowship	David Hestenes	Spacetime algebra	Oersted Medal (2002)
Bernhard Neumann	Partial operations in universal algebra	Adams Prize	Peter M. Neumann	Solution of Alhazen's problem	Senior Whitehead Prize; David Crighton Medal
David Milman	Krein–Milman theorem	Obituary in Integral Equations and Operator Theory	Vitali Milman	Work in geometric measure theory Concentration of measure	Israel Prize in mathematics
Sixto Rios	Decision theory	Bachelor's Degree Extraordinary Award	David Rios Insua	Bayesian inference	Peccei Award (IIASA)
David George Kendall	Statistical shape analysis	Fellow of the Royal Society	Wilfrid Kendall	Work in Stochastic geometry President of the Bernoulli Society (2013–2015)	
Jacques-Louis Lions	Lions–Magenes lemma	John von Neumann Prize; Japan Prize	Pierre-Louis Lions	Viscosity solution	Fields Medal
Takashi Ono	Number theory Algebraic groups	Memorial tribute in Notices of the AMS	Ken Ono	Number theory	Presidential Early Career Award for Scientists and Engineers
Joram Lindenstrauss	Johnson–Lindenstrauss lemma	Israel Prize; Stefan Banach Medal	Elon Lindenstrauss	Major advance on Littlewood conjecture	Fields Medal

== See also ==
- List of second-generation physicists
