= Drummer Boy =

Drummer Boy or Little Drummer Boy may refer to:

== Military ==
- Drummer boy (military), children recruited for use as military drummers on the battlefield
- The Drummer Boy of Chickamauga, John Clem
- The Drummer boy of Tacuarí, Pedro Ríos

== Literature and the arts ==
=== Music ===
- "The Little Drummer Boy", a popular Christmas song written in 1941
  - "Drummer Boy" (Justin Bieber song), a rendition of "The Little Drummer Boy" with added rap verses by Canadian singer Justin Bieber and rapper Busta Rhymes from the album Under the Mistletoe
  - Peace on Earth/Little Drummer Boy, a version performed by singer Bing Crosby and English singer David Bowie
- "Drummer Boy" (Alesha Dixon song), by English singer-songwriter Alesha Dixon released in 2010
- "Drummer Boy" (Debi Nova song), by Costa Rican singer-songwriter Debi Nova released in 2010
- "Drummer Boy", a 2007 song by Sean Kingston from his self-titled album
- "Drummer Boy Dub", a track on the 1996 album Dub Take the Voodoo Out of Reggae by Mad Professor with Lee "Scratch" Perry
- A Drummer Boy Christmas, a 2020 album by For King & Country
  - A Drummer Boy Christmas Tour, tour in support of the album
- Little Drummer Boy Live, a 2006 album by Mark Kozelek
- Drummer Boy (EP), a 1995 EP by Christian folk group Jars of Clay
- Drumma Boy, American record producer and hip hop artist

=== Film, television, theater, and literature ===
- The Little Drummer Boy (TV special), a stop-motion animated television special released in 1968
- Drummer Boy (Part 1) and (part 2), episodes of the American TV sitcom 8 Simple Rules
- The Drummer Boy, an episode of the American TV sitcom The Brady Bunch
- "The Drummer Boy of Shiloh", short story by Ray Bradbury
- "Drummer Boy", an episode of the TV series Pocoyo
- Drummer Boy (film), a 2026 American historical drama musical

== Other ==
- Little Drummer Boy Challenge, a mind game

== See also ==
- The Little Drummer Girl (novel), a 1983 John le Carré novel
