= Caballé =

Caballé (pronounced [kəβəˈʎe]) is a Catalan surname that may refer to:

- Eduardo Torroja Caballé (1847–1918), Spanish mathematician
- Josep Caballé Domenech (born 1973), Spanish musician and conductor
- Marc Caballé Naranjo (born 1991), Spanish footballer
- Montserrat Caballé i Folch (1933–2018), Spanish operatic soprano
- Montserrat Martí Caballé (born 1972), Spanish operatic soprano, daughter of Montserrat Caballé
