= Argentine Mathematical Union =

Mathematical society in Argentina

- Unión Matemática Argentina
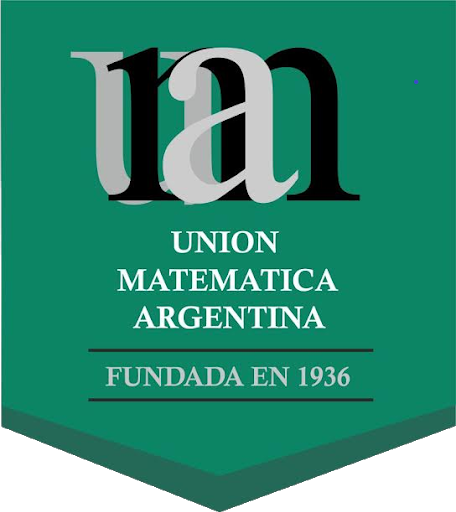
- Abbreviation: UMA
- Formation: 28 September 1936; 89 years ago
- Type: Mathematical society
- Headquarters: Güemes 3450, CP 3000, Santa Fe
- Location: Santa Fe de la Vera Cruz, Argentina
- President: Ursula Molter
- Website: www.union-matematica.org.ar

The Argentine Mathematical Union (Spanish: Unión Matemática Argentina, UMA) is a mathematical society founded in 1936. The UMA is based in Santa Fe, Argentina, and is a member of the Mathematical Union of Latin America and the Caribbean. It is recognised by the International Mathematical Union.

== History ==
The first mathematical society in Argentina was the Sociedad Matemática Argentina, which was founded in 1924, and whose president was Juan Blaquier. The society published a journal called Revista Matemática, and was disbanded in 1927.

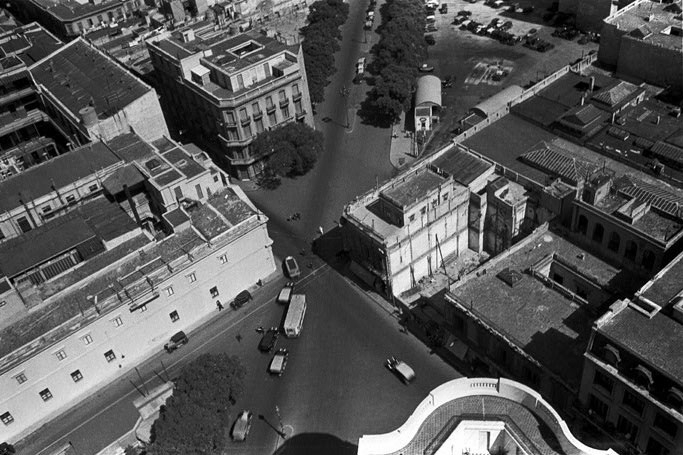
The first headquarters of the UMA were close to the corner of Perú and Diagonal Sur, pictured here in 1936.

Julio Rey Pastor was instrumental in the founding of the UMA in 1936.

The Argentine Mathematical Union was founded on 28 September 1936 in a ceremony held at the University of Buenos Aires; its headquarters were initially at Perú 255, Buenos Aires. In its early years the driving force in the UMA was Julio Rey Pastor, who was later described by Luis Santaló as talented at creation and promotion, but inconsistent at execution. For example, the first edition of the Journal of the UMA was issued by a different publishing house than had been agreed at its founding, and listed the founders incorrectly on its front cover.

In its early years the UMA received several distinguished mathematicians as visitors, including George Birkhoff in 1942, Marshall H. Stone in 1942 and 1947 (who became an honorary member of the UMA on his second visit), and Laurent Schwartz in 1958.

== Activities ==
The UMA holds an annual meeting, which from 1945 to 1975 was known as the Jornadas Matemáticas, and since then has been called the Reunión Anual. The 2024 meeting was held at the National University of Catamarca in Catamarca.

== Publications ==
The main publication of the Argentine Mathematical Union is the Journal of the UMA (Spanish: la Revista de la UMA). The Journal was first published in 1936, the year of the founding of the UMA; the first 6 volumes were somewhat disorganised. In 1940 José Babini was appointed director and from then on publication was more structured. In 1940 the Journal of the UMA was merged with the Journal of the Argentine Physical Association, and they were published together until 1968, when they separated again.

The UMA also publishes the Revista de Educación Matemática in partnership with the National University of Córdoba's department of mathematics, astronomy, physics, and computer science.

== Governance ==
=== Presidents ===
The past presidents of the Argentine Mathematical Union are:

- Manuel Guitarte (1936–1941)
- José Babini (1942–1943)
- José González Galé (1943–1944)
- Fernando L. Gaspar (1944–1945)
- Alejandro Terracini (1945–1947)
- Alberto González Domínguez (1947–1949)
- Julio Rey Pastor (1949–1951)
- Alberto González Domínguez (1951–1953)
- César A. Trejo (1953–1955)
- Alberto González Domínguez (1955–1957)
- José Babini (1957–1967)
- Luis Antoni Santaló (provisional, Oct 1967–Jun 1968)
- Alberto González Domínguez (1968–1976)
- Orlando E. Villamayor (1976–1982)
- Carlos Segovia Fernández (1982–1986)
- Roberto Leonardo Cignoli (1986–1989)
- Roberto Macías (1989–1993)
- Juan Alfredo Tirao (1993–1997)
- Felipe Joaquín Zó (1997–2001)
- Jorge Solomin (2001–2005)
- Carlos Cabrelli (2005–2009)
- Hernán Cendra (2009–2011)
- Eleonor Harboure (2011–2013)
- Hugo Aimar (2013–2015)
- Nicolás Andruskiewitsch (2015–2019)
- Alejandro Neme (2019–2021)
- Ursula Molter (2021–present)

=== Legal status and statutes ===
The UMA was registered as a "non-profit civil association" (Spanish: asociación civil sin fines de lucro) in 1978. The current statutes of the UMA, adopted in August 2023, specify that it is headquartered in Sante Fe and that its principle activities include the encouragement of research and study of mathematics, the promotion of mathematics education at all levels, and working towards equality for women and queer people in mathematics.

== See also ==
- List of mathematical societies
