= Giovanni Fagnano =

Italian mathematician (1715–1797)

Giovanni Francesco Fagnano dei Toschi
- Born: 31 January 1715; Senigallia, Papal States
- Died: 14 May 1797 (aged 82); Senigallia, Papal States
- Occupations: Catholic priest; Mathematician
- Known for: Fagnano's problem
- Parent(s): Giulio Carlo de' Toschi di Fagnano and Francesca Conciatti
- Scientific career
- Fields: Mathematics

Giovanni Francesco Fagnano dei Toschi (born 31 January 1715 in Senigallia, died 14 May 1797 in Senigallia) was an Italian churchman and mathematician, the son of Giulio Carlo de' Toschi di Fagnano, also a mathematician.

== Religious career ==
Fagnano was ordained as a priest. In 1752 he became canon, and in 1755 he was appointed archdeacon of the cathedral of Senigallia.

== Mathematics ==
Fagnano is known for Fagnano's problem, the problem of inscribing a minimum-perimeter triangle within an acute triangle. As Fagnano showed, the solution is the orthic triangle, whose vertices are the points where the altitudes of the original triangle cross its sides. Another property of the orthic triangle, also proven by Fagnano, is that its angle bisectors are the altitudes of the original triangle.

Fagnano also partially solved the problem of finding the geometric median of sets of four points in the Euclidean plane; this is the point minimizing the sum of its distances to the four given points. As Fagnano showed, when the four points form the vertices of a convex quadrilateral, the geometric median is the point where the two diagonals of the quadrilateral cross each other. In the other possible case, not considered by Fagnano, one point lies within the triangle formed by the other three, and this inner point is the geometric median. Thus, in both cases, the geometric median coincides with the Radon point of the four given points.

== See also ==
- List of second-generation mathematicians
