= Fagnano's problem =

Optimisation problem in triangle geometry

orthic triangle: $\triangle DEF$ inscribed triangles: $\triangle DEF\,,\triangle GHI$ $|DE|+|EF|+|FD|\leq |GH|+|HI|+|IG|$

In geometry, Fagnano's problem is an optimization problem that was first stated by Giovanni Fagnano in 1775:

For a given acute triangle determine the inscribed triangle of minimal perimeter.

The solution is the orthic triangle, with vertices at the base points of the altitudes of the given triangle.

== Solution ==
The orthic triangle, with vertices at the base points of the altitudes of the given triangle, has the smallest perimeter of all triangles inscribed into an acute triangle, hence it is the solution of Fagnano's problem. Fagnano's original proof used calculus methods and an intermediate result given by his father Giulio Carlo de' Toschi di Fagnano. Later, however, several geometric proofs were discovered as well, among others by Hermann Schwarz and Lipót Fejér. These proofs use the geometrical properties of reflections to determine some minimal path representing the perimeter.

== Physical principles ==
A solution from physics is found by imagining putting a rubber band that follows Hooke's law around the three sides of a triangular frame $ABC$, such that it could slide around smoothly. Then the rubber band would end up in a position that minimizes its elastic energy, and therefore minimize its total length. This position gives the minimal perimeter triangle. The tension inside the rubber band is the same everywhere in the rubber band, so in its resting position, we have, by Lami's theorem, $\angle bcA = \angle acB, \angle caB = \angle baC, \angle abC = \angle cbA$

Triangle abc is the orthic triangle of triangle ABC

Therefore, this minimal triangle is the orthic triangle.

Fagnano's problem also provides a path along which light can reflect within a mirrored triangle, returning to its original position and orientation after finitely many reflections. Thus, it solves for acute triangles the problem of finding a periodic path in triangular billiards. The existence of such a path remains open for arbitrary triangles.

== Proofs in absolute geometries ==
The minimality of the perimeter of the orthic triangle can be proven in a more general setting, that of absolute geometry and even weaker settings.

== See also ==
- Set TSP problem, a more general task of visiting each of a family of sets by the shortest tour
