= Science and Technology in the Discovery of America =

1945 work by Julio Rey Pastor

Science and Technology in the Discovery of America (Spanish: La ciencia y la técnica en el descubrimiento de América), is a work by the historian and mathematician Julio Rey Pastor, published in Spanish in 1945, in Buenos Aires, by the Espasa-Calpe publishing. A second, "improved and corrected" edition was published in 1945. A third and fourth edition were published in 1951 and 1970, respectively.

== Description ==
In this book, Rey Pastor analyzes the role of science and technology in the discovery of America, with special attention to the contributions of disciplines such as geography, cartography, nautical science and cosmography, which were decisive for the realization of transoceanic expeditions, such as that of Christopher Columbus, whom Rey Pastor considers a man of science, taking into account what was understood in his time by "man of science". The work reviews the scientific situation prior to the discovery and the evolution of latitude measurement and geographical representation techniques, highlighting how these innovations allowed the navigation challenges of the time to be faced. He insists on the enormous disproportion between the magnificent results of the discoverers and the poverty of the means at their disposal.

The book highlights the leading role of Spanish science during the Golden Age, highlighting its advances in various fields, and offers a response to the Black Legend, with the aim of recognizing Spanish contributions to European scientific progress. With an approach that is both rigorous and informative, the book has been recognized for its impact on the study of science applied to navigation and geographical exploration. And the professor at the University of Seville Antonio de Castro Brzezicki says that it is a book "of delightful reading".

According to Rey Pastor, scientific and technological knowledge, despite being rudimentary, played a fundamental role in the success of the discovery of America. The technical thinking of the time was influenced by the legacy of figures such as Fibonacci, who introduced the Indo-Arabic numeral system to Europe, and Roger Bacon, a defender of experimentation as the basis of scientific knowledge. This knowledge made discovery possible and, at the same time, promoted the development of science, highlighting the importance of technology in this historical process.

This vision has been shared by thinkers such as Gaston Bachelard and reinforced by figures such as Alexander von Humboldt. This approach allows for a reassessment of Columbus as a curious and systematic observer of nature, as reflected in his notes. It also shows the transition from an Aristotelian qualitative science to a Renaissance science based on observation, measurement and verification, which would later be followed by scientists such as Galileo, Kepler and Newton.

The work highlights figures such as Infante Don Henry of Portugal, who contributed to the development of geography and explorations along the African coast. Also mentioned is Martin Behaim, a German cosmographer who made the first modern globe in 1492, despite errors such as not including the discovery of the Cape of Good Hope by Bartolomeu Dias.
