= Vish (game) =

In the game of Vish (short for vicious circle), players compete to find circularity in dictionary definitions. Irish mathematician and physicist, John Lighton Synge, invented the multi-player, refereed game to emphasize the circular reasoning implicit in the defining process of any standard dictionary.

In his book, Projective Geometry, H.S.M. Coxeter cites Vish in his discussion of definitions in mathematics:

Vish illustrates the important principle that any definition of a word must inevitably involve other words, which require further definitions. The only way to avoid a vicious circle is to regard certain primitive concepts as being so simple and obvious that we agree to leave them undefined.

== Procedure ==
1. Each of the players is given a copy of the same standard dictionary;
2. The referee gives each a slip of paper with the same word (found in this dictionary) written on each slip—word chosen so that it has synonyms in its definition, but (preferably) the definition of any synonym does not (in that dictionary) list a synonym which is the originally assigned word;
3. At "Go!", each looks up the assigned word, finds a synonym, looks that up, finds a synonym, etc.;
4. The first player to be led, by this synonymous process, back to the originally assigned word cries "Vish!" and wins the game (unless his opponent successfully challenges the procedure of the alleged winner).
