= Ariat Arena =

Multi-purpose arena in Fort Worth, Texas, U.S.

- Location within Texas Location within the United States
- Former names: Dickies Arena (2019–October 2026)
- Address: 1911 Montgomery Street
- Location: Fort Worth, Texas, U.S.
- Coordinates: 32.7408908°N 97.3699379°W
- Owner: City of Fort Worth
- Operator: Trail Drive Management Corporation
- Capacity: Concerts: 14,000; basketball: 13,550; family shows and hockey: 12,200; rodeo performances: 9,300

Construction
- Groundbreaking: 2015
- Opened: November 8, 2019
- Cost: $540 million
- Architect: David M. Schwarz
- General contractor: The Beck Group

Tenants
- Fort Worth Stock Show & Rodeo 2020–present Panther City Lacrosse Club (NLL) 2021–2024; Texas Rattlers (PBR) (2022-present)

Website
- dickiesarena.com

Ariat Arena, formerly known as Dickies Arena, is a 14,000-seat multipurpose arena, located within the Will Rogers Memorial Center in Fort Worth, Texas, United States. The venue hosted a public ribbon cutting on October 26, 2019. The first event held was a Twenty One Pilots concert on November 8, 2019.

The facility is the result of a public-private partnership between Fort Worth, Tarrant County, the state of Texas, and a group of private-sector participants, including foundations, individuals, and organizations. The arena was designed by the 2015 Driehaus Prize winner David M. Schwarz and is owned by Fort Worth and managed by the not-for-profit Multipurpose Arena Fort Worth (MAFW).

It hosts concerts, sporting events, and family entertainment, and serves as the home of the Fort Worth Stock Show & Rodeo. The rodeo is sanctioned by the Professional Rodeo Cowboys Association (PRCA) and has been held at Ariat Arena since 2020. The venue was the home of the Professional Bull Riders (PBR) World Finals in 2022 and 2023. Since 2022, it has been the home arena of Rattler Days; the hometown event of the Texas Rattlers during the PBR Team Series season. In 2025, the PBR hosted its Last Cowboy Standing event as part of the rodeo. In 2026, the last four days of the PBR World Finals returned to Dickies Arena. The Fort Worth Stock Show and other equestrian events are held at the adjacent Will Rogers Memorial Center.

== Naming ==
On April 18, 2017, as part of the "Let The Dirt Fly" groundbreaking ceremony, MAFW and Dickies announced a surprise partnership that established Dickies as the naming rights partner for the venue. The Fort Worth-based company is the world's leading performance workwear brand. In June 2026, Dickies announced that it would be opting out of its naming rights deal. In October 2026, Ariat, another performance footwear company and sponsor of the FWSSR, bought the naming rights in a ten year deal.

== Seating ==
With a wide variety of seating configurations, the arena is able to accommodate many styles of events. There are 3 standard levels: plaza level (100-sections), suite and loge box level, and gallery level (200-sections); and 1 additional with floor seating.

== Acoustics ==
While in the design phase, Ariat Arena was built with the intent of having the sound of a concert hall. Great care was given to minimize or eliminate "echo."

== Center-hung scoreboard ==
Ariat Arena has the second-largest, continuous 360-degree screen in North America. The scoreboard extends past the width of the basketball court.

The board measures 105 feet across and 26 feet tall.

There are 1.2 million LEDs installed on the board.

== Events ==
=== Concerts ===
Dates	Headliner	Supporting Acts	Tour	Attendance	Revenue	Notes
2019
November 8	(United States) Twenty One Pilots	MisterWives	The Bandito Tour	12,435 / 12,658	$891,443	First-ever concert in the arena.
November 11	(South Korea) SuperM	—N/a	We Are The Future Live	8,393	$367,032	There was only one price level for this event; all tickets were US$50.00, which was the only price set for all available seats. This was also the first foreign act to headline the arena.
November 14	(United States) The Black Keys	Modest Mouse	Let's Rock Tour	—N/a	—N/a	—N/a
November 17	(United States) MercyMe	Crowder; Micah Tyler	Imagine Nation Tour	9,907 / 10,239	$495,346	—N/a
November 22-23	(United States) George Strait	—N/a	—N/a	27,168 / 27,168	$5,794,152	This was the first country concert held in the arena and the largest and highest-grossing concert held to date.
December 3	(United States) 106.1 KISS FM'S Jingle Ball		Jingle Ball Tour 2019	Unknown		The line up included performances by: Camila Cabello, Sam Smith, Charlie Puth, Lizzo, Lauv and Why Don't We.
December 14	(United States) Pepe Aguilar	—N/a		Unknown		First Latin music artist to perform in the arena.
Total				57,903 / 58,458	$7,547,973	
2020
February 22	(United States) Alan Jackson	—N/a				
July 4	(United States) Fort Worth Symphony Orchestra	Megan Koch, Fort Worth Opera; Texas Ballet Theater; Fei-Fei, The Cliburn; Major Attaway	FWSO America Strong Concert	—N/a		Broadcast on WFAA-TV Channel 8 ABC; no in-person audience due to the COVID-19 pandemic.
2021
June 16	(United States) Steely Dan	Steve Winwood	2021 Tour	—N/a		
July 24	(United States) The Dude Perfect Show	—N/a	2020 Tour	—N/a		
August 20	(United Kingdom) Rod Stewart	Cheap Trick	—N/a			
September 13	(United Kingdom) Eric Clapton	Jimmie Vaughan	2021 NORTH AMERICAN TOUR	11,370	$2,230,660	—N/a
September 21	(Canada) Michael Bublé	—N/a	An Evening with Michael Bublé	—N/a		First Canadian artist to perform in the Arena.
October 1	(United States) Kiss	David Garibaldi	End of the Road World Tour	9,658 / 9,937 (97%)	$1,251,573	
October 19	(United States) James Taylor & His All-Star Band	Jackson Browne	2021 Fall Tour	—N/a		
December 3	(Australia) For King & Country	—N/a	A Drummer Boy Christmas Tour	—N/a		
2022
February 22	(South Korea) Twice	—N/a	Twice 4th World Tour III	10,357	$1,169,384	—N/a
April 1	(United States) Eric Church	—N/a	Gather Again Tour	14,193	$1,797,404	—N/a
May 17	(United Kingdom) Paul McCartney	—N/a	Got Back	12,093	$3,985,850	—N/a
June 6	(South Korea) Monsta X	—N/a	No Limit Tour	10,068 / 10,461	$872,200	—N/a
August 20	(United States) Rob Zombie	Mudvayne, Static-X, Powerman 5000	Freaks on Parade Tour	—N/a		A video tribute for the late Texan guitarist Dimebag Darrell was shown during Mudvayne's performance. (The concert was held on what would have been his 56th birthday.)
August 23	(South Korea) Seventeen	—N/a	BE THE SUN	9,282 / 10,105	$1,117,761	—N/a
September 10	(United States) The Killers	Johnny Marr	Imploding the Mirage Tour	12,964 / 13,224	$737,731	—N/a
September 11	(United States) Panic! at the Disco	Beach Bunny, Jake Wesley Rogers	Viva Las Vengeance Tour	—N/a		
October 2	(United States) Mary J. Blige	Queen Naija	Good Morning Gorgeous Tour	9,680 / 11,084	$1,385,861	—N/a
October 6	(South Korea) Enhypen	—N/a	Manifesto (tour)	10,043 / 11,230	$1,392,457	—N/a
October 26	(United States) Post Malone	Roddy Ricch	Twelve Carat Tour	11,860	$1,473,785	—N/a
November 16	(South Korea) Ateez	—N/a	The Fellowship: Break The Wall	11,023	$1,476,047	—N/a
2023
March 26-27	(South Korea) Stray Kids	—N/a	Stray Kids 2nd World Tour "MANIAC"	22,626	$2,553,994	—N/a
April 20	(Puerto Rico) Rauw Alejandro	Jabbawockeez	Saturno World Tour	13,068 / 13,343	$1,595,821	First Puerto Rican singer to perform in the Arena.
April 28	(United States) Kenny Loggins	Yacht Rock Revue	This Is It! His Final Tour	TBA		
May 6	(United States) Brooks & Dunn	Scotty McCreery; Megan Moroney	REBOOT Tour	TBA		
May 24	(South Korea) Mamamoo	—N/a	My Con World Tour	6,387 / 10,472	$1,018,340	—N/a
June 9	(United States) Koe Wetzel	Treaty Oak Revival	Road To Hell Paso Tour	TBA		
June 22	(United States) Big Time Rush	MAX; Jax	Can't Get Enough Tour	TBA		
June 24	(United States) Kid Rock	Marcus King	Bad Reputation Tour	TBA		
June 29	(Canada) Bryan Adams	Joan Jett & the Blackhearts	So Happy It Hurts Tour	TBA		
July 8	(United States) Paramore	Foals; The Linda Lindas	This Is Why Tour	TBA		
July 29	(United States) ZZ Top; Lynyrd Skynyrd	Uncle Kracker	The Sharp Dressed Simple Man Tour	TBA		
August 2	(United States) NF	Cordae	Hope Tour	TBA		
August 26	(Mexico) Banda MS	—N/a	MS20 Tour	TBA		First Mexican headliner
September 7	(United Kingdom) Sam Smith	Jessie Reyez	GLORIA the Tour	TBA		
September 16	(United Kingdom) Arctic Monkeys	(Republic of Ireland) Fontaines D.C.	—N/a			
September 29	(United States) Luke Bryan	Chayce Beckham; Jackson Dean; Hailey Whitters	Country On Tour	TBA		
October 9	(United Kingdom) The 1975	Dora Jar	Still... At Their Very Best	TBA		
October 13	(Canada) Shania Twain	Lily Rose	Queen of Me Tour	TBA		
October 14	(United States) Jason Aldean	Mitchell Tenpenny; Corey Kent; Dee Jay Silver	Highway Desperado Tour	TBA		
October 15	(United States) Avenged Sevenfold	Falling in Reverse	Life Is but a Dream... Tour	TBA		
October 27	(United States) Kiss	—N/a	End of the Road World Tour	TBA		
November 17-18	(United States) George Strait	—N/a	2023 Stadium Shows	TBA		
December 1	(United States) Lauren Daigle	—N/a	The Kaleidoscope Tour	TBA		
December 2	(United States) Jon Pardi	Ella Langley; DJ Highmax	Mr. Saturday Night World Tour	TBA		
December 8	(United States) Trans-Siberian Orchestra	TBA	The Ghosts of Christmas Eve: The Best of TSO and More	TBA		
December 15	(Australia) For King & Country	—N/a	A Drummer Boy Christmas Tour	TBA		
December 20	(United States) Pentatonix	—N/a	The Most Wonderful Tour of the Year	TBA		
December 31	(United States) Parker McCollum	Corey Kent; Catie Offerman	—N/a	TBA		
2024
March 7	(United States) Fall Out Boy	Jimmy Eat World The Maine Daisy Grenade	So Much For (Tour) Dust	TBA		Fall Out Boy started late due to travel issues at DFW affecting frontman Patrick Stump's arrival.
March 8	(United States) Dan + Shay	Ben Rector Hailey Whitters	Heartbreak on the Map Tour			
March 20	(South Korea) IVE	—N/a	Show What I Have World Tour	7,320	$882,302	—N/a
April 12	(United States) Tim McGraw	Carly Pearce	Standing Room Only Tour '24	TBA		
June 4	(United States) Justin Timberlake		The Forget Tomorrow World Tour	TBA		
June 25	(United States) Blink-182	Pierce the Veil Live Without	One More Time Tour	TBA		
July 10	(United States) AJR	TBA	The Maybe Man Tour	TBA		
July 19	(United States) Chris Brown	Muni Long Maeta	The 11:11 Tour	TBA		Brown was sued for $50 million after assaulting four men in his paid entourage after his July 20th performance.
July 20	(United States) Chris Brown	Muni Long Maeta	The 11:11 Tour	TBA		Brown was sued for $50 million after assaulting four men in his paid entourage after his July 20th performance.
July 25	(United States) Janet Jackson	Nelly	Together Again	TBA		
August 21	(United States) Barry Manilow	—N/a	The Last Fort Worth Concert	TBA		
September 17	(South Korea) NCT DREAM	—N/a	The Dream Show 3: Dream( )scape	TBA		
September 18	(United States) Rob Zombie	Alice Cooper, Ministry	Freaks on Parade Tour	—N/a		The band Filter was also part of the tour as seen on posters and ads, but they were unable to perform (according to Rob Zombie) due to taking ill.
September 25	(Germany) Hans Zimmer	—N/a	Hans Zimmer Live	TBA		
October 26	(United States) Conan Gray	Maisie Peters	Found Heaven on Tour	TBA		
November 2	(United States) Chris Tomlin	Tauren Wells	Holy Forever World Tour	TBA		
November 13	(United States) Creed	3 Doors Down; Mammoth WVH	Are You Ready? Tour	TBA		
November 16	(United Kingdom) Iron Maiden	The Hu	The Future Past World Tour	TBA		
December 7	(United States) Alabama	David Lee Murphy	Roll On II North America Tour	TBA		
2025
February 15	(United States) Alan Jackson	Zach Top	One More For The Road Tour	TBA		
March 27	(United States) Rascal Flatts	Lauren Alaina; Chris Lane	Life Is a Highway Tour	TBA		
April 26	(United States) Disturbed	Daughtry; Nothing More	The Sickness 25th Anniversary Tour	TBA		
May 7	(United Kingdom) Billy Idol	Joan Jett and the Blackhearts	It’s A Nice Day To…Tour Again!	TBA		
June 13	(United States) Wu-Tang Clan	Run the Jewels	Wu-Tang Forever: The Final Chamber	TBA		
July 16	(United States) Goo Goo Dolls	Dashboard Confessional	Summer Anthem Tour	TBA		
July 22	(Japan) Ado		Hibana World Tour	TBA		
August 15	(Sweden) Ghost	—N/a	Skeletour World Tour	TBA		
September 7	(South Korea) Babymonster		Hello Monsters World Tour	TBA		
September 13	(United States) Nine Inch Nails	Boys Noize	Peel It Back Tour	TBA		
October 9	(Australia) Keith Urban	Alana Springsteen; Chase Matthew; Karley Scott Collins	High and ALive World Tour	TBA		
2026
February 27	(United States) Eric Church	Stephen Wilson Jr.	Free the Machine Tour	—	—	—
February 28 & March 1	(United States) Lady Gaga	—N/a	The Mayhem Ball	—	—	This is Lady Gaga's first headlining concerts in the Arena.
March 10	(United States) Conan Gray	Esha Tewari	Wishbone World Tour	—	—	—
March 31	(United States) The Neighbourhood	—N/a	The Wourld Tour	—	—	—
April 2	(United States) Bailey Zimmerman	Hudson Westbrook; Blake Whiten	Different Night Same Rodeo Tour	—	—	—
May 7	(England) Florence and the Machine	CMAT	Everybody Scream Tour	—	—	This is the band's first concert in Fort Worth.
May 29	(United States) Alex Warren	—N/a	Little Orphan Alex Live	—	—	This is Warren's first-ever arena tour.
June 21	(England) Louis Tomlinson	The Aces	How Did We Get Here? World Tour	—	—	—
June 23	(Australia) 5 Seconds of Summer	The Band CAMINO	Everyone's a Star! World Tour	—	—	—
June 26, 28, July 11, 13 (Rescheduled dates)	(Canada) Rush	—N/a	Fifty Something Tour	—	—	—
July 30	(United States) Meghan Trainor	Icona Pop	The Get In Girl Tour	—	—	—
August 9	(Canada) The Guess Who	Don Felder	Takin' It Back Tour	—	—	—
October 16	(England) Gorillaz	Little Simz; Deltron 3030	The Mountain Tour	—	—	—

=== Cancelled shows ===
List of cancelled concerts, showing date, city, country, venue and reason for cancellation
Date	Headliner	Supporting acts	Tour	Reason
July 18, 2020	(United States) Rascal Flatts	Chase Rice; Matt Stell	Farewell: Life Is a Highway Tour	COVID-19 pandemic
August 18, 2020	(United States) Camila Cabello	PRETTYMUCH	The Romance Tour	Canceled on May 7, 2020, due to COVID-19 pandemic

=== Sports ===
- The arena hosted its first Hot Wheels Monster Truck Live show on November 15 & 16, 2019.
- TCU hosted the first sporting event in Dickies Arena with a non-conference basketball game against USC on December 6, 2019.
- Since 2020, Dickies Arena has been home to the rodeo section of the Fort Worth Stock Show & Rodeo. It has been sanctioned by the Professional Rodeo Cowboys Association (PRCA) for many years and was previously held at Will Rogers Memorial Coliseum.
- 2021 and 2022 NCAA Women's Gymnastics Championship
- The American Athletic Conference has hosted its annual American Athletic Conference men's basketball tournament and American Athletic Conference women's basketball tournament at Dickies Arena each year since 2021.
- Dickies Arena hosted first and second-round games during the 2022 NCAA Division I men's basketball tournament.
- On July 22, 2020, the National Lacrosse League announced it would be expanding to Fort Worth for the 2021–22 season, playing its home games at Dickies Arena.
- The Professional Bull Riders (PBR) hosted a regular-season Unleash the Beast Series event at Dickies Arena on August 29 and 30, 2020. The event returned on August 28 and 29, 2021. In 2022 and 2023, Dickies Arena served as the home of the PBR World Finals, now held every May after taking place for many years in the autumn in Las Vegas, Nevada. Also since 2022, Dickies Arena has been the home venue of Rattler Days; the hometown event of the Texas Rattlers during the PBR Team Series season held every summer through autumn. For several years, a PRCA Xtreme Bulls event called Bulls' Night Out was held as part of the Fort Worth Stock Show & Rodeo. However, in 2025, the all-bull riding event at the rodeo was the PBR's Last Cowboy Standing event. In 2026, the Bulls' Night Out event returned to the Fort Worth Stock Show & Rodeo. Also, the PBR World Final returned to Dickies Arena in 2026 for the event's "Championship" rounds.
- On March 20, 2021, boxing hosted Vergil Ortiz Jr. vs Maurice Hooker. Ortiz Jr won by the 7th-round TKO to win the WBO International welterweight title.
- On July 18, 2021, WWE presented the 2021 Money in the Bank pay-per-view event from Dickies Arena, making it the first WWE pay-per-view to take place outside of Florida since the 2020 Elimination Chamber event prior to the COVID-19 pandemic.
- From August 4 through August 14, Dickies Arena hosted the 2022 Rocket League World Championship, a premier Esports tournament.
- From October 31 through November 7, Dickies Arena hosted the 2022 WTA Finals.
- Dickies Arena hosted the CrossFit Games from August 8 through August 11, 2024.
- The arena hosted the 2024 Fortnite Championship Series Global Championship on September 7 and 8, 2024.
- The Rocket League Championship Series returned for their 2024 World Championship event, held from September 10 through September 15.
- Dickies Arena will host the Fort Worth Super Regional rounds of the 2026 NCAA Women's Basketball March Madness tournament.
- The Rocket League Championship Series returned again for their 2026 World Championship event, held from September 15 through September 20.
