= José Babini =

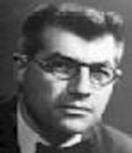
José Babini

José Babini (10 May 1897, Buenos Aires – 18 May 1984, Buenos Aires) was an Argentine mathematician, engineer, and historian of mathematics and mathematical sciences.

Babini worked for a construction company, where the owners recognized his mathematical talent and made it possible for him to pursue academic study. From 1918 he studied in Buenos Aires. In 1921 he graduated with a qualification to teach natural science and mathematics. In 1922 he received his degree as a civil engineer. Already in 1917 he contacted the well-known Spanish mathematician Julio Rey Pastor. Instead of working as a civil engineer, Babini taught mathematics at the Faculty for Industrial Chemistry of the Universidad Nacional del Litoral in Rosario. There he introduced new methods of numerical analysis and was considered a leading Argentine expert in this field. He then taught at the Faculty of Sciences of Education (Facultad de Ciencias de la Educación) in Paraná, Entre Ríos and at the Colegio Nacional y la Escuela Industrial. When Aldo Mieli came from Paris to Argentina in 1938, he and Babini founded at the Universidad Nacional del Litoral in Rosario the Instituto de Historia y Filosofía de la Ciencia (with the support of Rey Pastor). The Instituto existed until 1943. Babini was an editor for the journal Archeion (founded by Mieli in 1919 with the name Archivio di Storia della Scienza) and with Mieli edited the series Panorama general de historia del ciencia in 12 volumes. In this series, Babini wrote, with Desiderio Papp, El siglo de iluminismo on the exact sciences in the 19th century (volume number 8 of the series).

He was a major organizer of science in Argentina and a member of the national research council CONICET. From 1955 to 1966 he was the dean of the Facultad de Ciencias Exactas y Naturales of the National University in Buenos Aires. In 1957 he was the rector and interim director of the newly founded Universidad Nacional del Nordeste. He also presided over Argentina's newly founded university publishing house EUDEBA (Editorial Universitaria de Buenos Aires).

Babini was a member of the editorial board of Historical Studies in the Physical Sciences and was a co-founder of the journal Quipu: Revista Latinoamericana de Historia de las Ciencias y la Tecnología (based in Mexico City).

He was Invited Speaker of the ICM in 1928 in Bologna. He was the author, co-author, or editor of numerous books (at least 70) and essays as well as translations. In particular, he also published the first books on the history of science as it developed in Argentina.

== Selected publications ==
- with J. Rey Pastor: Historia de la matemática, 1953
- Biografía de los infinitamente pequeños, 1957
- Historia sucinta de la matemática, 1953
- Origen y naturaleza de la ciencia, 1947
- Arquímedes, 1948
- Historia de la ciencia argentina, 1951
- La evolución del pensamiento cientifico en la Argentina, 1953
- El saber en la historia, 1971
- El siglo de las luces: ciencia y tecnología, 1971
- Historia de la medicina, 1980
