= John Lighton Synge =

Irish mathematician and physicist (1897–1995)

John Lighton Synge ForMemRS
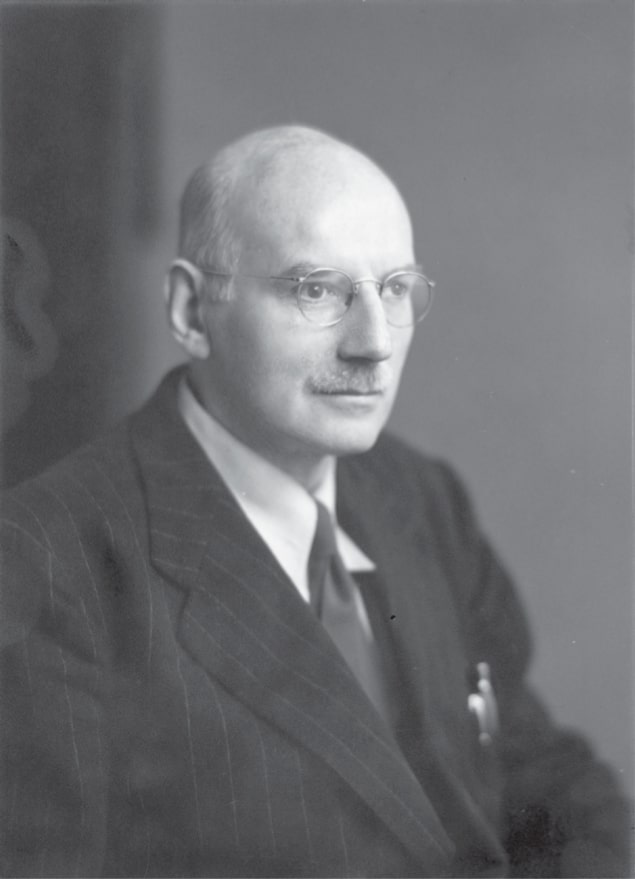
- John Lighton Synge
- Born: John Lighton Synge; 23 March 1897; Dublin, Ireland
- Died: 30 March 1995 (aged 98); Dublin, Ireland
- Known for: Synge's theorem Synge's world function Jüttner–Synge distribution
- Awards: Boyle Medal (1972); Henry Marshall Tory Medal (1943); ForMemRS (1943)
- Scientific career
- Fields: Physics

John Lighton Synge FRS FRSC (/sɪŋ/; 23 March 1897 – 30 March 1995) was an Irish mathematician and theoretical physicist, whose seven-decade career included significant periods in Ireland, Canada, and the USA. He was a prolific author and influential mentor, and is credited with the introduction of a new geometrical approach to the theory of relativity. In his lifetime he wrote more than 400 papers and 11 books.

== Background ==
Synge was born 1897 in Dublin, Ireland, into a prominent Church of Ireland family. He attended St. Andrew's College, Dublin and in 1915 entered Trinity College Dublin (TCD). He was elected a Foundation Scholar his first year, which was unusual as it was normally won by more advanced students. While an undergraduate at TCD, he spotted a non-trivial error in Analytical Dynamics, a textbook by E. T. Whittaker, who had recently taught there, and notified Whittaker of the error. In 1919 he was awarded a B.A. in Mathematics and Experimental Physics, and also a gold medal for outstanding merit. In 1922 he was awarded an M.A., and in 1926 a Sc.D., the latter upon submission of his published papers up to then.

In 1918, Synge had married Elizabeth Eleanor Mabel Allen (1896–1985). She was another student at TCD, first of mathematics, then of history, but family finances forced her to leave without graduating. Their daughters Margaret (Pegeen), Cathleen and Isabel were born in 1921, 1923 and 1930 respectively. The middle girl grew up to become the distinguished Canadian mathematician Cathleen Synge Morawetz.

Synge's uncle John Millington Synge was a famous playwright. He is more distantly related to the 1952 Nobel prizewinner in chemistry Richard Laurence Millington Synge. He was a great-great-great-grandson of the mathematician and bishop Hugh Hamilton.

His older brother, Edward Hutchinson Synge (1890-1957), who was known as Hutchie, also won a Foundation Scholarship in Trinity for Mathematics, though he never graduated. While Hutchie's later independent research was long overlooked, he is now recognised for his pioneering work in optics, particularly in near field optical imaging.

He died on 30 March 1995 in Dublin.

== Career in mathematics and physics ==
Synge was appointed to the position of lecturer at Trinity College, and then accepted a position at the University of Toronto in 1920. From 1920 until 1925, Synge was an assistant professor of mathematics at the University of Toronto. There he attended lectures by Ludwik Silberstein on the theory of relativity, stimulating him to contribute "A system of space-time co-ordinates", a letter in Nature in 1921.

Synge returned to Trinity College Dublin, in 1925, where he was elected to a fellowship and was appointed the University Professor of Natural Philosophy (the old name for physics). He was a member of the American Mathematical Society and the London Mathematical Society. He was treasurer of the Royal Irish Academy in 1929. He went back to Toronto in 1930, where he was appointed Professor of Applied Mathematics and became Head of the Department of Applied Mathematics. In 1940, he supervised three Chinese students, Guo Yonghuai, Chien Wei-zang and Chia-Chiao Lin, who later became leading applied mathematicians in China and the United States.

He spent some of 1939 at Princeton University, and in 1941, he was a visiting professor at Brown University. In 1943 he was appointed as Chairman of the Mathematics Department of Ohio State University. Three years later he became Head of the Mathematics Department of the Carnegie Institute of Technology (which later became Carnegie Mellon University) in Pittsburgh, Pennsylvania, where John Nash was one of his students. He spent a short time as a ballistic mathematician in the US Air Force between 1944 and 1945.

He returned to Ireland in 1948, accepting the position of Senior Professor in the School of Theoretical Physics at the Dublin Institute for Advanced Studies. There, his colleagues included Erwin Schrödinger (a pioneer of quantum mechanics) and Cornelius Lanczos (an applied mathematician and physicist), both Senior Professors.

== His contributions ==
Synge made outstanding contributions to different fields of work including classical mechanics, general mechanics and geometrical optics, gas dynamics, hydrodynamics, elasticity, electrical networks, mathematical methods, differential geometry, and Einstein's theory of relativity. He studied an extensive range of mathematical physics problems, but his best known work revolved around using geometrical methods in general relativity.

He was one of the first physicists to seriously study the interior of a black hole, and his early work was cited by both Kruskal and Szekeres in their independent discoveries of the true (so-called maximal) structure of the Schwarzschild black hole. Synge's later derivation of the Szekeres-Kruskal metric solution, which was motivated by a desire to avoid "using 'bad' [Schwarzschild] coordinates to obtain 'good' [Szekeres-Kruskal] coordinates," has been generally under-appreciated in the literature, but was adopted by Chandrasekhar in his black hole monograph.

In pure mathematics, he is perhaps best known for Synge's theorem, which concerns the topology of closed orientable Riemannian manifold of positive sectional curvature. When such a space is even-dimensional and orientable, the theorem says it must be simply connected. In odd dimensions, it instead says that such a space is necessarily orientable.

He also created the game of Vish in which players compete to find circularity (vicious circles) in dictionary definitions.

=== Fields Medal ===
While at Toronto, he was a colleague of John Charles Fields and acted as secretary to the 1924 International Mathematical Congress, which was hosted by Fields. Fields had been planning the creation of an award for mathematicians, however, when he became ill in 1932, Synge represented Fields at the 1932 International Mathematical Congress, where the medal was approved. After Fields's death, Synge completed arrangements with the sculptor of the medal, R. Tait McKenzie and oversaw the disbursement of Fields's estate. The award is now known as the Fields Medal.

== Honours ==
Synge received many honours for his works. He was elected as a fellow of the Royal Society of London in 1943. He was elected as a fellow of the Royal Society of Canada, and in 1943 was the first recipient of the society's Henry Marshall Tory Medal, as one of the first mathematicians working in Canada to be internationally recognised for his research in mathematics. In 1954 he was elected an honorary fellow of Trinity College Dublin. He was president of the Royal Irish Academy from 1961 until 1964. The Royal Society of Canada established the John L. Synge Award in his honour in 1986.

John Lighton Synge retired in 1972. During his time at the Dublin Institute for Advanced Studies, about 12% of all workers in the relativity theory studied there. Professor Hermann Bondi, who gave the first J. L. Synge Public Lecture in 1992, had this to say: "Every one of the other 88% has been deeply influenced by his geometric vision and the clarity of his expression". He was awarded the Boyle Medal by the Royal Dublin Society in 1972.

During his long scientific career, Synge published over 200 papers and 11 books. He proved the result now known as Synge's theorem.

== Selected publications ==
Papers

- Synge, J. L. (1922). "Principal Directions in a Riemann Surface". Proc Natl Acad Sci U S A. 8 (7): 198–203. Bibcode:1922PNAS....8..198S. doi:10.1073/pnas.8.7.198. PMC 1085093. PMID 16586876.
- Synge, J. L. (1922). "Principal Directions in the Einstein Solar Field". Proc Natl Acad Sci U S A. 8 (7): 204–207. Bibcode:1922PNAS....8..204S. doi:10.1073/pnas.8.7.204. PMC 1085094. PMID 16586877.
- Synge, J. L. (1925). "A generalisation of the Riemannian line-element". Trans. Amer. Math. Soc. 27 (1): 61–67. doi:10.1090/s0002-9947-1925-1501298-7. MR 1501298.
- Synge, J. L. (1932). "The apsides of general dynamical systems". Trans. Amer. Math. Soc. 34 (3): 481–522. doi:10.1090/s0002-9947-1932-1501649-7. MR 1501649.
- Synge, J. L. (1934). "On the Expansion or Contraction of a Symmetrical Cloud under the Influence of Gravity". Proc Natl Acad Sci U S A. 20 (12): 635–640. Bibcode:1934PNAS...20..635S. doi:10.1073/pnas.20.12.635. PMC 1076503. PMID 16587921.
- Synge, J. L. (1938). "The absolute optical instrument". Trans. Amer. Math. Soc. 44 (1): 32–46. doi:10.1090/s0002-9947-1938-1501960-5. MR 1501960.

Books

- 1931 The Mathematical Papers of Sir William Rowan Hamilton: Volume 1, Geometrical Optics; Pub: Cambridge
- 1937 Geometrical Optics: An Introduction to Hamilton's Method; Pub: Cambridge
- 1942 Geometrical Mechanics and de Broglie Waves; Pub: Cambridge
- 1942 Principles of Mechanics (with Byron A. Griffith); Pub: McGraw Hill
- 1949 Tensor Calculus (with Alfred Schild) Mathematical Exposition #5 from University of Toronto Press
- 1951 Science: Sense and Nonsense; Pub: Norton / Jonathan Cape
- 1952 Jump Conditions at Discontinuities in General Relativity (with Stephen O'Brien); Pub: DIAS (Communications of the Dublin Institute for Advanced Studies 9, Series A)
- 1956 Relativity: The Special Theory; Pub: North-Holland
- 1956 Geometrical Optics in Moving Dispersive Media; Pub: DIAS (Communications of the Dublin Institute for Advanced Studies 12, Series A)
- 1957 The Relativistic Gas; Pub: New Holland
- 1957 The Hypercircle in Mathematical Physics; Pub: Cambridge
- 1957 Kandelman's Krim: A Realistic Fantasy; Pub: Jonathan Cape
- 1960 Relativity: The General Theory; Pub: North-Holland
- 1961 Notes on the Schwarzschild Line-Element (with Petros S. Florides); Pub: DIAS (Communications of the Dublin Institute for Advanced Studies 14, Series A)
- 1964 The Petrov Classification of Gravitational Fields; Pub: DIAS (Communications of the Dublin Institute for Advanced Studies 15, Series A)
- 1970 Talking About Relativity; Pub: North-Holland
- 1972 Quaternions, Lorentz Transformations and the Conway-Dirac-Eddington Matrices; Pub: DIAS (Communications of the Dublin Institute for Advanced Studies 21, Series A)
- 1972 General Relativity: Papers in Honour of J. L. Synge (editor Lochlainn O'Raifeartaigh); Pub: Clarendon/Oxford

== See also ==
- List of second-generation Mathematicians

== Sources ==
- Florides, Petros S. (1996). Prof John Lighton Synge, FRS, Obituary, IMS Bulletin 37.
- McCartney, Mark; Andrew Whitaker (2003). Physicists of Ireland: Passion and Precision. Bristol and Philadelphia: Institute of Physics Pub. ISBN 0-7503-0866-4.
- Synge, J. L. (1951). Science: Sense and Nonsense. London: Cape. (worldcat)
- Synge, J. L. (1957). Kandelman's Krim; A Realistic Fantasy. London: Cape. (worldcat)
