= Collegio Clementino =

- The Piazza Nicosia and Collegio Clementino (centre and right) in 1748. To the left is the Palazzo Aragona Gonzaga.
- Interactive map of the Collegio Clementino area

General information
- Architectural style: Renaissance
- Location: Rome, Italy
- Coordinates: Aragona Gonzaga 41.903°N 12.475°E

The Collegio Clementino is a palace in Rome, central Italy, sited between the Strada del'Orso and the banks of the Tiber. It was founded by Pope Clement VIII in 1595, to host Slavonian refugees. Giacomo della Porta was commissioned to erect a suitable building to house them, which would be one of the aged architect's last projects. On February 25, 1601, Urban VIII shifted the Slavs to Loreto and refounded the Collegio Clementino as an elite school for young noblemen of every nation and the richest families in Rome. The musical tradition of the Collegio Clementino remained strong: Alessandro Scarlatti wrote oratorios for Carnival seasons and came up from Naples to oversee their production.

Instruction "in all the sciences and the gentlemanly arts" according to a description of 1761, was entrusted to brothers of the Somaschi, a religious order of teaching brothers established during the Counter-Reformation, which had been authorized by Pope Pius V in 1568; they proved themselves expert in establishing seminaries. In the 17th and 18th century the Collegio Clementino produced Pope Benedict XIV, and numerous cardinals, including Domenico Silvio Passionei, Francesco Guidobono Cavalchini, Bartolomeo Pacca, Fabrizio Sceberras Testaferrata, the mathematician Giulio Carlo de' Toschi di Fagnano, and the Pacific explorer Alessandro Malaspina.

Here Carlo Spinola and Domenico Quartaironi taught the young polymath and inventor, Raimondo di Sangro, prince of Sansevero.

The college was disbanded in 1873.

== Bibliography ==
- Migliorini, Luigi Mascilli (1992). I Somaschi (in Italian). Roma: Ed. di Storia e Letteratura. pp. 9–12, 92–94.
- Zambarelli, Luigi (1936). Il nobile Pontificio Collegio Clementino di Roma (in Italian). Roma: Istituto Grafico Tiberino.
