= Eduardo Torroja Caballé =

Spanish mathematician (1847–1918)

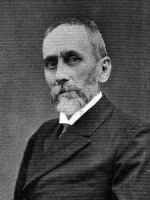
- Born: 1 February 1847; Tarragona, Catalonia, Kingdom of Spain
- Died: 1 June 1918 (aged 71); Madrid, New Castile, Kingdom of Spain
- Education: Complutense University
- Known for: Geometry textbooks
- Scientific career
- Fields: Geometry; mathematics

Eduardo Torroja Caballé (1 February 1847 – 1 June 1918) was a Spanish mathematician from the Catalan city of Tarragona.

== Biography ==
His father was Juan Torroja, a professor of Geography and History. He continued his studies at Complutense University, where he obtained the degrees of Bachelor of Science (1864), Masters of Science (1866), Architect (1869) and Doctor of Science (1873) in Mathematics.

Very early in his studies he became a disciple of Karl Georg Christian von Staudt, whose ideas of synthetic geometry he embraced and promoted among his fellow mathematicians for the rest of his life. The strong presence of geometry in Spain's mathematical curriculum, even to this day, can be traced back to Torroja's influence. In 1869, Torroja became a research fellow at the Astronomical Observatory in Madrid, where he contributed to the geodesic triangulation of Spain, initiated by the General Carlos Ibáñez. While working at that Research Institute, he became assistant professor at the Faculty of Sciences.

In 1873 he became a full professor of Algebra, Geometry, Trigonometry and Analytic Geometry at the University of Valencia. In 1876 he obtained the professorship in Descriptive Geometry at Complutense University, where he remained until his retirement due to terminal illness in 1916.

During his tenure he promoted research in synthetic geometry, influencing a generation of Spanish mathematicians, including Miguel Vegas, Cecilio Jiménez Rueda, José Álvarez Ude, Antonio Torroja, and Julio Rey Pastor. His books became highly regarded textbooks, expanding the scope of his influence and that of his inspiration, Karl von Staudt.

At that time Complutense University was the only University in the Spanish Empire entitled to grant Doctor degrees, so that most Spanish mathematicians can trace their academic genealogy to Dr. Torroja Caballé. In the year 1900, Torroja and his disciple Miguel Vegas, prepared the Curriculum for the studies of Sciences, which had an overwhelming focus on Descriptive and Analytic Geometry.

In the year 1891, Torroja was elected member of the Spanish Royal Academy of Sciences, where he was formally inducted in the year 1893 after offering his speech "Reseña de los medios empleados por la geometría pura actual para alcanzar el grado de generalidad y de simplificación que la distingue de la antigua". This speech argued that the work of Karl Georg Christian von Staudt is the unifying contribution to Geometry. In 1911 he became a founding member of the Spanish Mathematical Society, where he was vice president, with Echegaray and García de Galdeano.

== Works ==
- 1888: Programa de las Lecciones de Geometría descriptiva
- 1899: Tratado de la Geometría de Posición
- 1904: Teoría Geométrica de las Líneas Alabeadas
