= Eleonor Harboure =

Argentine mathematician (1948–2022)

Eleonor "Pola" Ofelia Harboure de Aguilera (15 June 1948 – 15 January 2022), who published professionally as Eleonor Harboure, was a mathematician from Argentina who was the first woman president of Unión Matemática Argentina (UMA), the Argentinian mathematical professional society. Harboure also served as the UMA's secretary.

Harboure earned a PhD from the University of Minnesota in 1978. Her PhD advisor was Nestor Marcelo Riviere and her dissertation work was in functional analysis. She had 8 PhD students of her own.
