= Zoel García de Galdeano =

Spanish mathematician

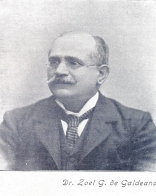
- Born: 5 July 1846; Pamplona, Spain
- Died: 28 March 1924 (aged 77); Zaragoza, Spain
- Education: University of Zaragoza
- Scientific career
- Fields: Mathematics

Zoel García de Galdeano y Yanguas (5 July 1846 – 28 March 1924) was a Spanish mathematician. He was considered by Julio Rey Pastor as "The apostle of modern mathematics".

== Biography ==
His father was a military man, and was killed in war action, so his maternal grandfather, the historian José Yanguas y Miranda (1782-1863), took care of Zoel. To continue his studies, in 1863, Zoel moved to Zaragoza, where he received the title of professor and expert surveyor. In 1869 he graduated as Bachelor. Later he began his studies of Philosophy and Letters, and Sciences at the University of Zaragoza. In 1871, he graduated from these two specialties.

Between 1872 and 1879, Zoel served as professor of mathematics at various schools and institutes in Spain. While he worked in the city of Toledo, he began to write mathematical works that introduced the modern concepts of the European Mathematical in Spain.

In 1889 he obtained the professorship of Analytic geometry at the University of Zaragoza, and in 1896, he was appointed to the professorship of Infinitesimal calculus. He worked at this university until his retirement in 1918.

In 1891, Zoel created El Progreso Matemático, the first strictly mathematical journal published in Spain. He was the principal editor in the two periods in which the journal was published (1891 – 1895 and 1899 – 1900). He was also the first contemporary Spanish mathematician to regularly participate in international congresses of mathematics.

He died in Zaragoza on 28 March 1924.
