= A Drummer Boy Christmas Tour =

2020–24 concert tour by For King & Country

- Tour by For King & Country
- Promotional poster for the tour
- Associated album: A Drummer Boy Christmas
- Start date: 12 November 2020
- End date: 19 December 2025
- Legs: 6
- No. of shows: 95

For King & Country concert chronology
- Together Again Tour (2020); A Drummer Boy Christmas Tour (2020–2023); Relate 2021 Tour (2021)

A Drummer Boy Christmas Tour is the eighth headlining tour by Australian Christian rock band For King & Country. The tour is in support of their 2020 album A Drummer Boy Christmas, and only toured the United States, Canada and the United Kingdom.

== Background ==
On 7 October 2020, For King & Country announced that they will be embarking on A Drummer Boy Drive-In: The Christmas Tour, in support of the album. The tour is partnership with the Salvation Army, for a national toy drive encouraging concertgoers to bring new, packaged toys for collection by local Salvation Army representatives and distribute them to families struggling during the holiday season. The tour spanned 20 dates, launched on 12 November 2020 at the Silver Lake Sports Complex in Norco, California, and concluded on 20 December 2020 at the Five Flags Speedway in Pensacola, Florida, all held in parking lots with a drive-in theater style atmosphere.

On 26 July 2021, For King & Country announced that they will be going on A Drummer Boy Christmas Tour, also in support of the album. The tour spanned 14 dates, and launched on 27 November 2021 at the Van Andel Arena in Grand Rapids, Michigan, and concluded on 19 December 2021 at the Ryman Auditorium in Nashville, Tennessee.

On 26 July 2022, For King & Country announced that they will be going back to A Drummer Boy Christmas Tour that winter. The tour spanned 15 dates, in which it launched on 26 November 2022 at the T-Mobile Center in Kansas City, Missouri, and concluded on 19 December 2022 at the Ryman Auditorium for the second consecutive year. The tour saw the Ryman for the third straight year, as well as it returned to Florida after the absence in 2021. The tour included the Estero and Grand Rapids stops for the second time and the Orlando stop for a second time but at a different venue.

On 17 July 2023, For King & Country announced that they will be continuing their A Drummer Boy Christmas Tour that winter. The band announced 18 dates, where it began on 25 November 2023, at the Now Arena in Hoffman Estates, Illinois, and conclude on 22 December 2023 at the Ryman Auditorium in Nashville, Tennessee, for the third consecutive year. The tour saw the band returning to Houston, Fort Worth and Minneapolis for the first time since 2021, a return to California and Arizona for the first time since the 2020 edition, and new stops such as the ones in Nevada, Oregon and Washington. The tour also saw the band bringing the tour to Canada for the first time.

On 22 July 2024, the band announced "A Drummer Boy Christmas | The 2024 Tour Experience" which will feature 6 shows at the Beacon Theatre in New York City, the Peacock Theater in Los Angeles and the band's 5th consecutive year with Christmas performances at the Grand Ole Opry House in Nashville. On 4 September, the band announced a performance on 12 December at Indigo at The O2 in London, which will be the band's first performance in Europe in 6 years. On 13 September, they announced a second show.

On 16 July 2025, the band announced "A Drummer Boy Christmas: The Only 2025 Live Appearances", after spending the year on hiatus from both touring and releasing music up to that point. The tour has 15 shows at 8 theaters across the United States, including a 5-night residency at the Grand Ole Opry House, the band's longest in history.

== Tour dates ==
List of 2020 concerts, showing date, city, country and venue
Date	City	Country	Venue
12 November 2020	Norco	United States	Silver Lake Sports Complex
13 November 2020	Roseville	United States	Denio's Market
14 November 2020	Tulare	United States	International Agri-Center
15 November 2020	Pasadena	United States	Rose Bowl
20 November 2020	El Paso	United States	El Paso County Coliseum
21 November 2020	Glendale	United States	Gila River Arena
22 November 2020	Tucson	United States	Pima County Fairgrounds
28 November 2020 (Note: 2 shows.)	Arlington	United States	Globe Life Park
29 November 2020	Nashville	United States	Ryman Auditorium
3 December 2020	Robstown	United States	Borchard Fairgrounds
4 December 2020	College Station	United States	Reed Arena
5 December 2020	Houston	United States	The MET Church
6 December 2020	Cedar Park	United States	H-E-B Center at Cedar Park
10 December 2020	Dade City	United States	Joy-Lan Drive-In
11 December 2020	Lakeland	United States	Silver Moon Drive-In
12 December 2020	Ocala	United States	Ocala Drive-In
13 December 2020	Estero	United States	Hertz Arena
18 December 2020	Orlando	United States	Central Florida Fairgrounds
19 December 2020	West Palm Beach	United States	South Florida Fairgrounds
20 December 2020	Pensacola	United States	Five Flags Speedway

List of 2021 concerts, showing date, city, country and venue
Date	City	Country	Venue
27 November 2021	Grand Rapids	United States	Van Andel Arena
28 November 2021	Louisville	United States	KFC Yum! Center
2 December 2021	Oklahoma City	United States	Chesapeake Energy Arena
3 December 2021	Fort Worth	United States	Dickies Arena
4 December 2021	Houston	United States	Toyota Center
5 December 2021	Cedar Park	United States	H-E-B Center at Cedar Park
9 December 2021	Des Moines	United States	Wells Fargo Arena
10 December 2021	Sioux Falls	United States	Denny Sanford Premier Center
11 December 2021	Minneapolis	United States	Target Center
12 December 2021	Omaha	United States	Baxter Arena
16 December 2021	St. Louis	United States	Enterprise Center
17 December 2021	Columbus	United States	Schottenstein Center
18 December 2021	Duluth	United States	Gas South Arena
19 December 2021	Nashville	United States	Ryman Auditorium

List of 2022 concerts, showing date, city, country and venue
Date	City	Country	Venue
26 November 2022	Kansas City	United States	T-Mobile Center
27 November 2022	Dallas	United States	American Airlines Center
1 December 2022	Lowell	United States	Tsongas Center
2 December 2022	Baltimore	United States	Chesapeake Employers Insurance Arena
3 December 2022	Hershey	United States	Giant Center
4 December 2022	Cleveland	United States	Rocket Mortgage FieldHouse
8 December 2022	Estero	United States	Hertz Arena
9 December 2022	Tampa	United States	Amalie Arena
10 December 2022	Orlando	United States	Amway Center
11 December 2022	Greensboro	United States	Greensboro Coliseum
15 December 2022	Indianapolis	United States	Gainbridge Fieldhouse
16 December 2022	Fort Wayne	United States	Allen County War Memorial Coliseum
17 December 2022	Grand Rapids	United States	Van Andel Arena
18 December 2022	Nashville	United States	Ryman Auditorium
19 December 2022	Nashville	United States	Ryman Auditorium

List of 2023 concerts, showing date, city, country and venue
Date	City	Country	Venue
25 November 2023	Hoffman Estates	United States	Now Arena
26 November 2023	Minneapolis	United States	Target Center
30 November 2023	West Valley City	United States	Maverik Center
1 December 2023	Boise	United States	ExtraMile Arena
2 December 2023	Everett	United States	Angel of the Winds Arena
3 December 2023	Portland	United States	Moda Center
4 December 2023	Abbotsford	Canada	Abbotsford Centre
7 December 2023	Henderson	United States	Dollar Loan Center
8 December 2023	Glendale	United States	Desert Diamond Arena
9 December 2023	Anaheim	United States	Honda Center
10 December 2023	Sacramento	United States	Golden 1 Center
14 December 2023	San Antonio	United States	AT&T Center
15 December 2023	Fort Worth	United States	Dickies Arena
16 December 2023	Tulsa	United States	BOK Center
17 December 2023	Houston	United States	Toyota Center
20 December 2023	Nashville	United States	Grand Ole Opry House
21 December 2023	Nashville	United States	Grand Ole Opry House
22 December 2023	Nashville	United States	Grand Ole Opry House

List of 2024 concerts, showing date, city, country and venue
Date	City	Country	Venue
1 December 2024	Los Angeles	United States	Peacock Theater
8 December 2024	New York City	United States	Beacon Theatre
9 December 2024	New York City	United States	Beacon Theatre
11 December 2024	London	United Kingdom	Indigo at The O2
12 December 2024	London	United Kingdom	Indigo at The O2
17 December 2024	Nashville	United States	Grand Ole Opry House
18 December 2024	Nashville	United States	Grand Ole Opry House
19 December 2024	Nashville	United States	Grand Ole Opry House
20 December 2024	Nashville	United States	Grand Ole Opry House

List of 2025 concerts, showing date, city, country and venue
Date	City	Country	Venue
2 December 2025	Orlando	United States	Dr. Phillips Center for the Performing Arts
3 December 2025	Orlando	United States	Dr. Phillips Center for the Performing Arts
5 December 2025	Grand Prairie (Note: Listed as Dallas in promotional material.)	United States	Texas Trust CU Theatre
6 December 2025	Sugar Land (Note: Listed as Houston in promotional material.)	United States	Smart Financial Centre
8 December 2025	Atlanta	United States	Fox Theatre
9 December 2025	St. Louis	United States	The Fabulous Fox
10 December 2025	Minneapolis	United States	Orpheum Theatre
11 December 2025	Minneapolis	United States	Orpheum Theatre
12 December 2025	Rosemont (Note: Listed as Chicago in promotional material.)	United States	Rosemont Theatre
13 December 2025	Rosemont	United States	Rosemont Theatre
15 December 2025	Nashville	United States	Grand Ole Opry House
16 December 2025	Nashville	United States	Grand Ole Opry House
17 December 2025	Nashville	United States	Grand Ole Opry House
18 December 2025	Nashville	United States	Grand Ole Opry House
19 December 2025	Nashville	United States	Grand Ole Opry House
