= Carmelo Ríos =

Carmelo Ríos may refer to:

- Carmelo Ríos (athlete) (1959–2022), long-distance runner from Puerto Rico
- Carmelo Ríos Santiago (born 1973), member of the Senate of Puerto Rico
