= Jacobo Rios Rodriguez =

Jacobo Ríos Rodríguez is Maître de Conférences in International Public Law and Dean of the Faculty of Law of the University of Perpignan Via Domitia (Associate Professor/Senior Lecturer, French civil servant).

== Education ==
Ríos has two nationalities, Spanish and French. He holds a PhD in Law from the Universities of Paris I Panthéon-Sorbonne (France) and La Coruña (Spain), a master's degree in International Law and International Organizations from the University of Paris I Panthéon-Sorbonne and an Habilitation à diriger des recherches - HDR from the University of Perpignan Via Domitia (highest university degree in France) which entitles him to supervise PhD theses.

== Research and works ==
His research topics focus on the role of the individual on the international legal order, especially on themes such as migration (trafficking and smuggling), human rights, international organizations experts, UN governance, cinematic representation of law, universal jurisdiction in the prosecution of international crimes, and environmental law. With regard to the field of international migration, he has participated in the Centre for Studies and Research in International Law and International Relations, The Hague Academy of International Law, 2010. His publications have appeared in three different languages, edited by French publishers (Dalloz, La Documentation française, Pedone, Société de législation comparée ...), English publishers (Hart Publishing - Oxford), Spanish publishers (Tirant lo Blanch) and Belgian publishers (Bruylant). He has also published articles on international law in several newspapers.

He has published two monographs and about thirty articles. He has also edited two collective works, organized several symposiums and participated in a wide range of symposiums and conferences. Moreover, Dr. Ríos is a member of the Société française pour le droit international (SFDI) and of the Asociación española de profesores de Derecho Internacional y Relaciones Internacionales (AEPDIRI), and he has also collaborated as an expert with the Agence nationale de la recherche (ANR) in France.
