= Vicente Gutiérrez de los Ríos y Gálvez =

Vicente Gutiérrez de los Ríos y Gálvez (Córdoba, February 7, 1732 - Madrid, June 2, 1779) was the III Marquis of Escalonias, a Spanish military officer, and a Cervantist.

== Biography ==
The natural son of Francisco José Gutiérrez de los Ríos Cárdenas y Cabrera, II Marquis of Escalonias, and Teresa Juana de Gálvez e Iranzo, both widowed residents of Córdoba, he was baptized on February 8, 1732, in the church of San Pablo in Córdoba, alongside his twin sister María Josefa. His parents legalized their marriage in 1736. At birth, he was named Diego Francisco, but during his confirmation around 1740, Bishop Pedro Salazar added the name Vicente.
