= Mark Rios =

Spanish artist and fashion designer

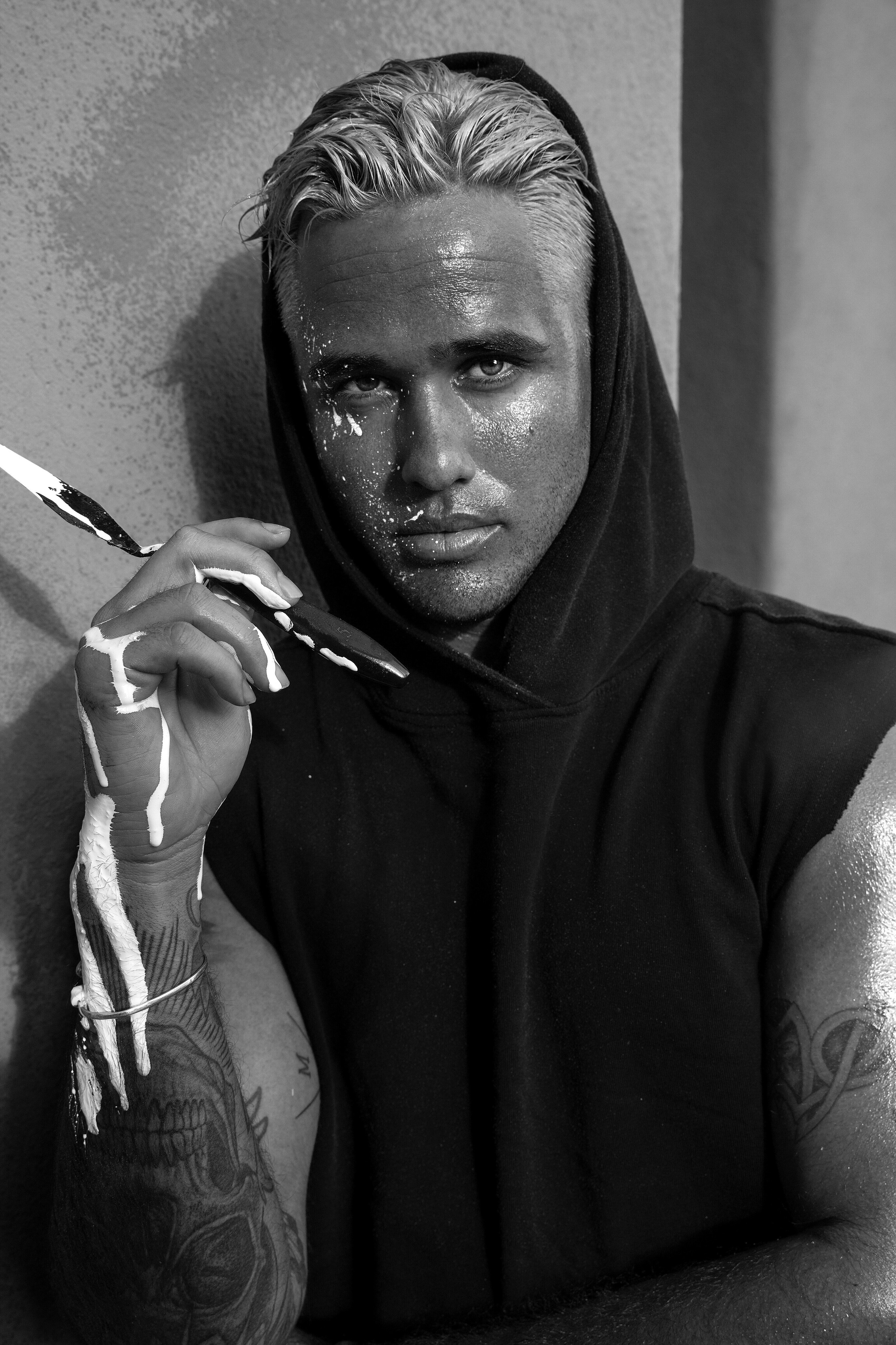
- Born: 28 November 1987 (age 38); Barcelona, Spain
- Education: ESDi School of Design
- Movement: Abstract expressionism

Mark Rios (born 28 November 1987 in Barcelona; professionally known as Mr. Dripping) is a Spanish artist and fashion designer. His works have been exhibited in Barcelona, Madrid, Florence, New York, Miami, and Los Angeles.

== Education ==
Mark grew up in Barcelona, Spain where he studied art at the Frederic Mistral school and later enrolled in the ESDi School of Design where he directed his career towards fashion designing.

== Career ==
He started his career with his own brand of clothing and bags that he was selling in multi-brand stores around the country. In 2015, he took the art using dripping method as a career. Dripping is a technique originally developed by Max Ernst in Germany and later used by American artist, Jackson Pollock. In the following year he moved to New York City and did his first show at PhD Dream Hotel featuring Kygo and a brand collaboration with Black Pyramid.

His works have been recognized by Will Smith, Kun Aguero, Tom Cruise, Sebastián Yatra, Antonio Banderas, Sara Sampaio, Marc-André ter Stegen, Paul Pogba, Luka Modrić, Chris Brown, Neymar Jr, Major Lazer, Nyjah Huston, Sara Sampaio, Cindy Kimberly, Nieves Álvarez, Sergio Agüero, Karim Benzema, Antonio Banderas, Thomas Pieters, Dsquared, Tom Cruise, Sebastián Yatra, Xavi Hernandez etc.

In December 2017, he exhibited his works in Miami and did a live performance with Major Lazer in the week of Art Basel.

In 2022, Mark Rios participated in the super cup by creating an art work for the MVP. Karim Benzema received an artwork after he was named Man of the Match in the 2022 Spanish super cup semi-finals. Real Madrid beat FC Barcelona 3-2 in the 2022 Spanish Super Cup semi-finals.

== Exhibitions ==
- NH Collection hotel (exhibition)
- El Principal De L’eixample (live)
- NH Collection Hotel (exhibition)
- El Principal de L’eixample (live show)
- Espai BM (exhibition)
- Galleria Vittorio Emanuele II (exhibition and show)
- Axel Hotels (exhibition and show)
- Estrella Damm (event)
- Nuba Lounge (exhibition and show)
- Barcelona Design Gallery (representation)
- 080 Barcelona (fashion week shows for brands) Moto GP Monster Grand Prix (live show)
- Formula 1 circuit Catalunya (exhibition and live show) MACBA (private event live show)
- Olivia Valere Marbella (live show)
- Barcelona Football team stadium (live show)
- Black pyramid Brand (live show) Barcelona, Spain
- Miquel Suay Brand (live show)
- One night in Beijing (exhibition and live show)
- Catalina Island (exhibition)
- The Mondrian Hotel (live show)
- Universal Gallery (exhibition)
- ME Hotel in Dubai (residency exhibition)
- Hotel At Six (exhibition)
