= Julio Rey Pastor =

Spanish mathematician and historian

- Born: 14 August 1888; Logroño, Spain
- Died: 21 February 1962 (aged 73); Buenos Aires, Argentina
- Education: Complutense University of Madrid
- Scientific career
- Fields: Mathematics
- Workplaces: Complutense University of Madrid; University of Buenos Aires
- Doctoral advisor: Eduardo Torroja Caballé; Felix Klein
- Doctoral students: Alberto Gonzalez Dominguez; Sixto Ríos

Seat F of the Real Academia Española
- In office 1 April 1954 – 21 February 1962
- Preceded by: Emilio Fernández Galiano
- Succeeded by: Manuel Halcón

Julio Rey Pastor (14 August 1888 – 21 February 1962) was a Spanish mathematician and historian of science.

== Biography ==
Julio Rey Pastor attended high school in his hometown, and began his studies in Sciences in Vitoria. He moved to the University of Saragossa, where he found a stimulating environment in mathematics. Zoel García de Galdeano, professor of Analytical Geometry and Calculus, was the professor who most influenced Rey Pastor's scientific work. He graduated with honors in 1908. Rey Pastor earned his doctorate from Complutense University of Madrid in 1909, under supervision of Eduardo Torroja Caballé. Between 1911 and 1914, he studied at the University of Berlin and the University of Göttingen, under the supervision of Felix Klein. During that period, he also studied under the supervision of Hermann Schwarz, Friedrich Hermann Schottky (father of Walter Schottky), and Ferdinand Georg Frobenius.

His report sent to the Junta para Ampliación de Estudios (JAE) allows an assessment of the significance of his studies in Germany. He especially liked Schwarz's lectures on analytic functions and synthetic geometry, not only because of their innovations but also because Schwarz's teaching method. In this report, Rey proposed the creation of a "seminar in mathematics to arouse the research spirit of our school children." His proposal was accepted and in 1915 the JAE created the Mathematics Laboratory and Seminar, an important institution for the development of research on this field in Spain.

From 1915, Julio Rey Pastor became a dominant figure in mathematics in Spain, and later Argentina. In that year the Junta created for him in Madrid the first mathematics research institute in Spain which was outside a university. There he started a research seminar, and contributed to the advance and modernization of mathematics research and teaching. He was also the author of a series of advanced mathematics textbooks which had a very considerable influence in the Iberian world….

Undoubtedly, the creation of the laboratory was a result of Rey Pastor’s studies in Germany, and it was intended to overcome the isolation and individualism of the Spanish mathematicians. This laboratory, under the National Institute of Sciences, was first installed in the basement of the National Library, then moved to a modest apartment on Santa Teresa St., then to the building of the Center for Historical Studies and, finally, became part of the Consejo Superior de Investigaciones Científicas (CSIC), renamed Instituto Jorge Juan de Matemáticas in 1939.

Rey Pastor's scientific work involved research, textbooks, and articles for the general public. They reflected the changes that were taking place in mathematics. He was also interested in the history of science and, specifically, mathematics in Spain.

From 1921 Rey Pastor settled permanently in Argentina...His influence in Argentina was as important as it had been in Spain...In the mid-1930s he directed a substantial group of research students in Buenos Aires. His continued interest in the mathematics life of Spain created two parallel schools, on both sides of the Atlantic, working on similar research projects.

Rey Pastor was instrumental in the founding of the Argentine Mathematical Union in 1936, and directed its journal from 1936 to 1940.

In 1951, he was appointed director of the Instituto Jorge Juan de Matemáticas in the CSIC. His plans in Spain included two projects: the creation, within the CSIC, of an Institute of Applied Mathematics, and the foundation of a Seminar on the History of Science at the university.

In 1954, he entered the Royal Spanish Academy, proposed by Gregorio Marañón, and Francisco Javier Sánchez Cantón, and delivered an acceptance speech on the algebra of language. (He had become a member of the Academy of Sciences in Madrid in 1920, and of the Academy of Sciences in Buenos Aires in 1932).

Rey Pastor showed his passion for mathematics as a researcher, as promoter of new studies, and as creator of agencies and institutions that enhanced the development of mathematics in Spain.

In 1956, he went back to Argentina and only returned to Spain on the occasion of the entry of his disciple, Sixto Ríos into the Academy of Sciences, on June 21, 1961. In his speech, Rey Pastor recalled the process of creation of the laboratory and the support from the JAE.

Rey Pastor occupied a seat in the Real Academia Española between 1953 and 1962.

== Memorials ==
He was honoured with a Spanish stamp in 2000.

A lunar crater Faraday G was called Reypastor by Hugh Percy Wilkins and Antonio Paluzie-Borrell, mappers of Earth's Moon, but the designation was not adopted by the International Astronomical Union.

The Calle Matematicos Rey Pastor y Castro, in Seville is named in his honour and that of his collaborator Antonio de Castro Brzezicki.

== Works ==
- 1910: (thesis) Correspondencia de figuras elemental, con aplicación al estudio de las figuras que engendran
- 1916: Fondamentos de la geometría proyectiva superior, JAE
- 1916: Introducción a la matemática superior, Madrid : Corona
- 1917: Teoría de la representación conforme, Barcelona: Institut d’Estudis Catalans
- 1929: Teoría geométrica de la polaridad en las figuras de las primera y segunda categorías, Madrid : Real Academia de Ciencias
- 1931: "Un método de sumación de series", Rendiconti del Circolo Matematico di Palermo 55: 450–5.
- 1942,5: La Ciencia y la Técnica en el Descubrimiento de América (pdf), Buenos Aires: Espasa-Calpe Argentina, link from Biblioteca Virtual Universal
- 1957: Apuntes de la teoría de los conjuntos abstractos, Universidad Nacional de Cuyo (Review : Alonzo Church (1963) Journal of Symbolic Logic 28(3) :250,1)
- 1958: (with A. de Castro Brzezicki) Funciones de Bessel (Bessel functions), Madrid: Editorial Dossat, MR 0098203

== See also ==
- António Aniceto Monteiro
