= Synge's theorem =

Relates the curvature of a Riemannian manifold to its topology

In mathematics, specifically Riemannian geometry, Synge's theorem is a classical result relating the curvature of a Riemannian manifold to its topology. It is named for John Lighton Synge, who proved it in 1936.

== Theorem and sketch of proof ==
Let M be a closed Riemannian manifold with positive sectional curvature. The theorem asserts:

- If M is even-dimensional and orientable, then M is simply connected.
- If M is odd-dimensional, then it is orientable.

In particular, a closed manifold of even dimension can support a positively curved Riemannian metric only if its fundamental group has one or two elements.

The proof of Synge's theorem can be summarized as follows. Given a geodesic S^{1} → M with an orthogonal and parallel vector field along the geodesic (i.e. a parallel section of the normal bundle to the geodesic), then Synge's earlier computation of the second variation formula for arclength shows immediately that the geodesic may be deformed so as to shorten its length. The only tool used at this stage is the assumption on sectional curvature.

The construction of a parallel vector field along any path is automatic via parallel transport; the nontriviality in the case of a loop is whether the values at the endpoints coincide. This reduces to a problem of pure linear algebra: let V be a finite-dimensional real inner product space with T: V → V an orthogonal linear map with an eigenvector v with eigenvalue one. If the determinant of T is positive and the dimension of V is even, or alternatively if the determinant of T is negative and the dimension of V is odd, then there is an eigenvector w of T with eigenvalue one which is orthogonal to v. In context, V is the tangent space to M at a point of a geodesic loop, T is the parallel transport map defined by the loop, and v is the tangent vector to the geodesic.

Given any noncontractible loop in a complete Riemannian manifold, there is a representative of its (free) homotopy class which has minimal possible arclength, and it is a geodesic. According to Synge's computation, this implies that there cannot be a parallel and orthogonal vector field along this geodesic. However:

- Orientability implies that the parallel transport map along every loop has positive determinant. Even-dimensionality then implies the existence of a parallel vector field, orthogonal to the geodesic.
- Non-orientability implies the non-contractible loop can be chosen so that the parallel transport map has negative determinant. Odd-dimensionality then implies the existence of a parallel vector field, orthogonal to the geodesic.

This contradiction establishes the non-existence of noncontractible loops in the first case, and the impossibility of non-orientability in the latter case.

Alan Weinstein later rephrased the proof so as to establish fixed points of isometries, rather than topological properties of the underlying manifold.
