= Julio Ríos Gallego =

Colombian engineer, lecturer, mentor

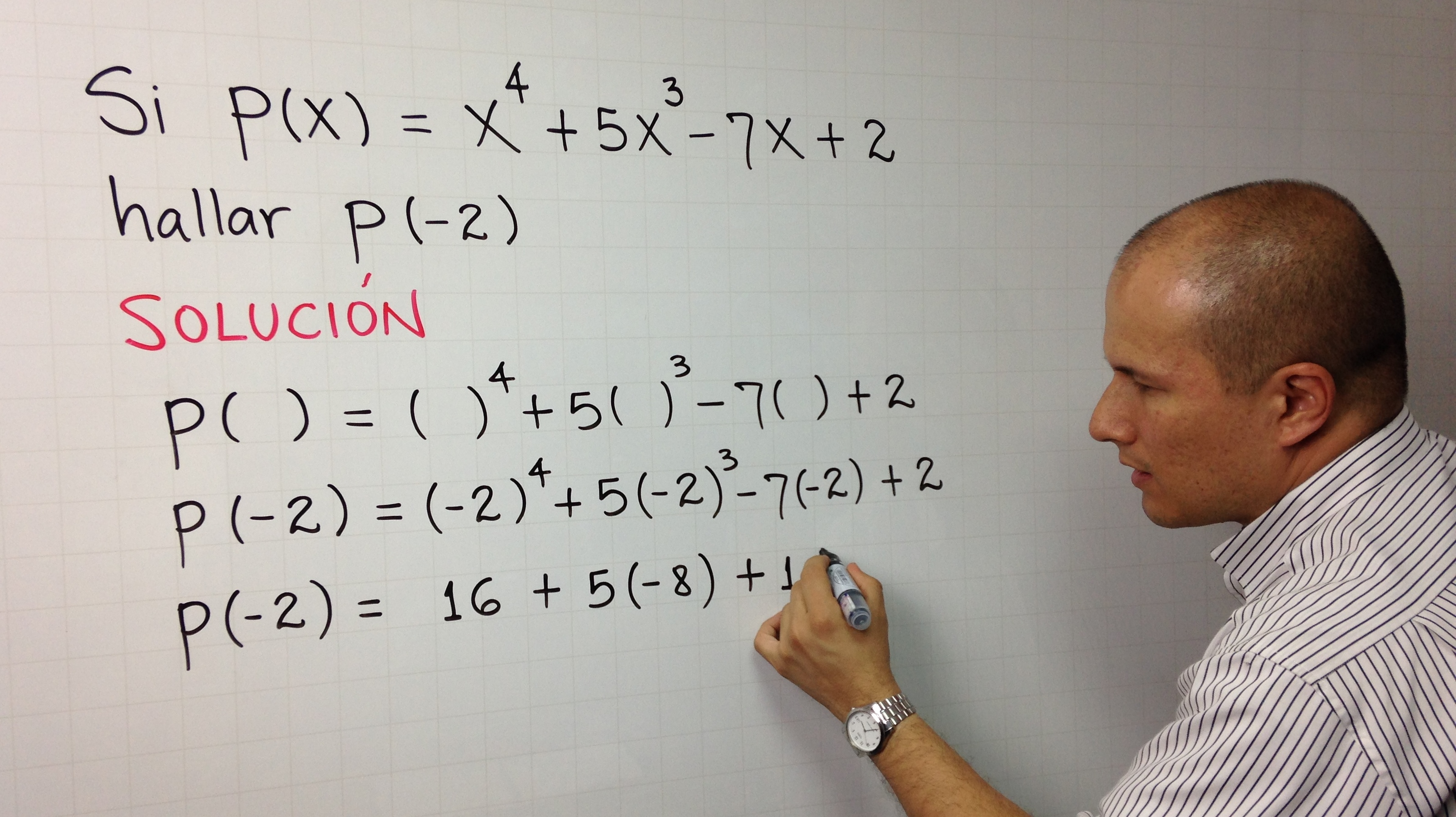
- Julio Ríos giving one of his online classes
- Born: Julio Alberto Ríos Gallego; 22 March 1973 (age 53); Cali, Colombia
- Other name: Julioprofe
- Education: Universidad del Valle
- Occupations: engineer, mentor, professor
- Children: 2
- Website: Julio Ríos Gallego

Julio Alberto Ríos Gallego (Cali, 22 March 1973) is a Colombian engineer, lecturer, mentor, professor of Mathematics and Physics.

== Early life, education and family ==
Born in Cali, he attended elementary and high school at Colegio Lacordaire, being the best student of his promotion. He studied civil engineering at Universidad del Valle. He is married and father of two daughters and currently lives in Cali.

== Career ==
He has been professor in colleges and universities, such as "Colegio Hebreo Jorge Isaacs" the "Corporación Universitaria Minuto de Dios" and the Faculty of Medicine Universidad San Martín in Cali. Trying to motivate his students, on 6 April 2009 he went to the internet, creating virtual classes with the Julioprofe channel. His channel has 4.2 million subscribers in YouTube, and more than 500 million views

Known as Julioprofe, he appeared in e-learning videos of free education in the areas of: algebra, geometry, trigonometry, analytic geometry, computing, physics, linear algebra and higher mathematics. He uses a teaching technique where he is a professor Guardian and the student can learn from their computer, smartphone, iPod, at home at any time.

Since September 2011, he is part of the educational project Academia Vasquez, responsible for video production of algebra and representative of Colombia said educational project.

In February 2013, he signed an agreement with the "Fundación Transformemos" (winner of the UNESCO Confucius Prize 2012), to produce videos of math

== Recognition ==
He was nominated in "Best Leaders of Colombia Awards in 2012"

He was nominated the "Revolutionary Award" in 2013 in Latinos Innovation category, for his contribution to internet education, and U.S. recognition that use social networks to generate positive changes.
