= Drummer boy of Tacuarí =

Argentine soldier (1798–1811)

Pedro Ríos (1798–1811), better known as the Tambor de Tacuarí (Drummer boy of Tacuarí in English) was a boy soldier who participated as a drummer in Manuel Belgrano's expedition to Paraguay (1810–11). He was killed in action while encouraging the troops at the battle of Tacuarí, where he also assisted a blinded officer. The drummer of Tacuarí became an iconic figure of the Argentine War of Independence.

== Early life ==
Ríos was born in Yaguareté-Corá (today known as Concepcion, in Corrientes Province), the son of an aging rural teacher. On 25 November 1810, Belgrano's troops arrived in Yaguareté-Corá. Ríos, then a 12-year old boy, offered his services to Belgrano, who denied the request. It was after the intervention of Ríos father, Antonio, that the general accepted the boy in the ranks of his army. He was assigned to the company of Mayor Celestino Vidal, a blinded officer, in order to become Vidal's guide.

== Expedition to Paraguay ==
The first time that Ríos saw action in Paraguay was during the battle of Paraguarí, in January 1811, where Belgrano's troops were routed. The boy Ríos was in charge of the artillery wagons and also help the wounded in the field hospital, but later in the engagement he guided the march of the soldiers as a drummer, ignoring the risks of being exposed to enemy fire in the first line of battle.

In the battle of Tacuarí, on 9 March 1811, Ríos assisted his blinded mayor, leading in the meantime the company's troops with his drumbeat. He was eventually hit by two bullets in the chest and fell. Mayor Vidal, feeling that the drummer was wounded, attempted to save him, but to no avail. Vidal claimed that he owed his own life to Ríos, who received the shots that were actually aimed to him.

== Iconic figure of Argentine independence ==
A late 19th century depicting the drummer assisting Mayor Vidal during the battle

In his late years, Manuel Belgrano recalled the death of the Drummer of Tacuarí as one of his most poignant memories. In 1912, Argentina's National Council of Education established that the drummer must be remembered in the anniversary of the battle in all elementary schools as an example of gallantry and self-denial. A 1909 poem composed by Rafael Obligado commemorates the drummer boy's deeds. There are monuments to the drummer both at the Colegio Militar de la Nación and at his native city of Concepción.

=== Revisionism ===
Historian Daniel Balmaceda put in question the very existence of the drummer boy, arguing that the children is not present in the battle reports and that the first mention to the drummer of Tacuarí is found 45 years after the Paraguayan campaign, and depicted shortly after in a painting with a 50-year-old blind man; however, Vidal was nearly 21 years old when the battle took place.
