= David Ríos Insua =

Spanish mathematician

David Ríos Insua (born June 21, 1964 in Madrid) is a Spanish mathematician, and son and disciple of Sixto Ríos, the "father of Spanish statistics." He is currently also the youngest Fellow of the Spanish Royal Academy of Sciences (de la Real Academia de Ciencias Exactas, Físicas y Naturales, RAC), which he joined in 2008. He received a PhD in Computational Sciences at the University of Leeds. He is Full Professor of the Statistics and Operations Research Department at Rey Juan Carlos University (URJC), and he has been Vice-dean of New Technologies and International Relationships at URJC (2002–2009). He has worked in fields such as Bayesian inference in neuronal networks, MCMC methods in decision analysis, Bayesian robustness or adversarial risk analysis. He has also worked in applied areas such as Electronic Democracy, reservoirs management, counterterrorism model and many others. He is married and has two daughters.

== Career ==
- He obtained his master's degree in Mathematics at Universidad Complutense de Madrid (UCM, 1987), with Extraordinary and National Awards.
- He did his PhD studies at Manchester and Leeds where he obtained his PhD degree in 1990.
- He has been a lecturer and researcher at Universidad Politécnica de Madrid (UPM), Duke University, Purdue University, Université Paris-Dauphine, International Institute for Applied Systems Analysis (IIASA), Consiglio Nazionale delle Ricerche-Istituto di Matematica Applicata e Tecnologie Informatiche (CNR-IMATI), Statistical and Applied Mathematical Sciences Institute (SAMSI), where he was director of the Risk Analysis, Extreme Events and Decision Theory program.
- He was director of the Towards Electronic Democracy (TED) program de la European Science Foundation (ESF).
- He is current codirector of the Algorithmic Decision Theory (ALGODEC) program cofunded by the European Cooperation in Science and Technology (COST) and the European Science Foundation (ESF).
- He has supervised 15 PhD theses.
- He has supervised over 40 cofunded projects.

== Awards ==
- Extraordinary and National master's degree Award.
- UPM Award for young researchers.
- Ramiro Melendreras Award of Sociedad de Estadística e Investigación Operativa (SEIO) for young researchers.
- Peccei Award from International Institute for Applied Systems Analysis (IIASA) for young researchers.
- WirsboURJC Research Award.
- Everis Award from Capital Semilla.
- SRA Award for best Decision Analysis paper.

== Publications ==
- He is the author of 15 books or monographs, including Sensitivity Analysis in Multiobjective Decision Making (Springer), Statistical Decision Theory (Kendall's), Robust Bayesian Analysis (Springer), E-Democracy: A GDN perspective (Springer), and Bayesian Analysis of Stochastic Processes (Wiley).
- He is or has been associated editor of journals such as the Journal of Computational and Graphical Statistics, Group Decision and Negotiation, Journal of Multicriteria Decision Analysis, Serie A: Matemáticas de la Revista de la Real Academia de Ciencias Exactas, Físicas y Naturales (RACSAM), International Journal of Public Information Systems. International Transactions in Operational Research. and Decision Analysis.
