= Sixto Ríos =

Spanish mathematician and statistian (1913–2008)

- Born: Sixto Ríos García; 4 January 1913; Pelahustán, Toledo, Spain
- Died: 8 July 2008 (aged 95); Madrid, Spain
- Education: Complutense University of Madrid
- Children: 6, including David
- Scientific career
- Workplaces: University of Valencia; University of Valladolid; Complutense University of Madrid
- Thesis: Problemas de hiperconvergencia, memoria presentada para obtener el grado de Doctor en Ciencias (1936)
- Doctoral advisor: José Gabriel Álvarez Ude
- Other academic advisors: Julio Rey Pastor

Sixto Ríos García (4 January 1913 – 8 July 2008), was a Spanish mathematician, known as the father of Spanish statistics.

== Early life and education ==
As the son of José María Ríos Moreiro and Maria Cristina Garcia Martin, Ríos García was taught by his parents, who were teachers. When the family moved to Madrid, he attended St. Maurice School and the IES San Isidro, being always the valedictorian.

In 1932 he graduated with a degree in Mathematics from the Complutense University of Madrid, with the best marks and getting the award "Premio Extraodinario", later he obtained a Ph.D. in Mathematics in 1936 under the supervision of José Gabriel Álvarez Ude. He was a student of Julio Rey Pastor and the Laboratory and Seminar of Mathematics (LSM). He recalled that Esteban Terradas influenced his entry to statistics.

== Career ==
Ríos García became professor of mathematical analysis at the University of Valencia, as well as in the University of Valladolid and Madrid. He also became Doctor Engineer Geographer, and professor at the Technical School of Aeronautical Engineering and the Faculty of Economics.

He held the positions of Director of the School of Statistics at Complutense University of Madrid, Director of Consejo Superior de Investigaciones Científicas (CSIC) (Superior Council for Scientific Research), Director of the Department of Statistics at the Faculty of Mathematics at the Complutense University of Madrid, and president of the Spanish Statistics and Operations Research Society. He was a correspondent of the National Academy of Sciences of Argentina.

Rios published a Spanish language description of the Von Neumann–Morgenstern utility theorem.

He was a member of the editorial board of Statistical Abstracts and full member of the International Statistical Institute and the Institute of Mathematical Statistics.

He conducted research with or directed theses of 16 professors, and some directors in statistical bureaus of Latin America. He conducted applied research for the Spanish industry and formed the School of Operations Research. He lectured at universities around the world and presented papers at international conferences and published in international journals, and helped to set up and direct research centers such as the School of Statistics at the University of Madrid, the Institute of Operations Research and Statistics at the Spanish National Research Council (CSIC) and its journal Works on Operations Research and Statistics, the School of Statistics at the Central University of Venezuela and the Department of Statistics and Operations Research at the Faculty of Sciences, with international courses sponsored by the Organization of American States (OAS) and UNESCO.

Rios Garcia married Maria Jesus Insua Negrao and they had six children, three of them (including David Ríos Insua) also became mathematicians following their father's profession.

== Awards ==
Sixto Rios received the Spanish National Award for Mathematical Research in 1979. He was Academic of the Spanish Royal Academy of Sciences from 1961 until his death, and Doctor Honoris Causa by the University of Oviedo (2000) and the University of Seville (2001).

Because of his fundamental contributions to Spanish research, he is considered the father of statistics in Spain.

== Publications ==
He is the author of over 200 research works, publications and monographs, on mathematical analysis, probability and statistics and operations research, among them: Statistical Methods, (Ediciones del Castillo, SA, 1967), Special Mathematics (Madrid: Paraninfo, 1972) Applied Mathematics (Madrid: Paraninfo, 1980) and Multi-criteria Decision Processes (Madrid: Eudema, 1990).

- 1943: "Sobre la reordinacion de series funcionales y sus aplicaciones", Abhandlungen aus dem Mathematischen Seminar der Universität Hamburg 15(1): 87–51 MR 3069732
- 1952 : Introduccion a los Metodos de Estadistica, first part MR 0052065
- 1954 : Introduccion a los Metodos de Estadistica, second part MR 0067409
- 1958: "Sur les lignes de regression", Bulletin de l'Institut International de Statistique 36(3) :64–70 MR 0124954
- 1981: Forward to Dictionary of Statistical, Scientific and Technical Terms (Spanish-English) by Hardeo Sahai and Jose Barrios, Wadsworth Publishing ISBN 9788453400042 MR 0629539
- 1983: "Ramiro Melendreras Gimeno (1944—1983)", Trabajos de Estadisticas y de Investigacion Operativa 34(3): 3–5.MR 0829560
- 1994: "The probabilistic revolution" MR 1469512
- 1999: "Fundamentos y appliaciones del analysis de decisiones" (PDF). Revista de la Real Academia de Ciencias Exactas, Físicas y Naturales (Esp). 93 (4): 393–4. Archived from the original (PDF) on April 5, 2010., from Centro de informacion y documentacion cientifica
