= Giulio Carlo de' Toschi di Fagnano =

Italian mathematician (1682–1766)

Giulio Carlo di Fagnano FRS
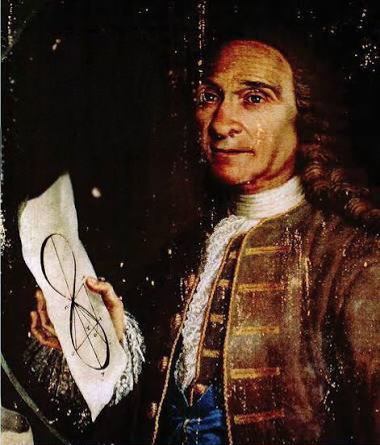
- Portrait of Fagnano
- Born: 26 September 1682; Senigallia, Papal States
- Died: 18 May 1766 (aged 83); Senigallia, Papal States
- Education: Collegio Clementino, Rome
- Occupations: Mathematician; Civil servant
- Known for: Discovery of addition and multiplication formulas for arcs of lemniscate
- Spouse: Francesca Conciatti (m. 1705; died 1726)
- Children: Giovanni Fagnano
- Awards: ForMemRS (1723)
- Scientific career
- Fields: Mathematics

Giulio Carlo, Count Fagnano, Marquis de Toschi (26 September 1682 — 18 May 1766) was an Italian mathematician. He was probably the first to direct attention to the theory of elliptic integrals. Fagnano’s work is considered the forerunner of the theory of elliptic functions.

== Life ==
Giulio Fagnano was born to Francesco Fagnano and Camilla Bartolini in Senigallia (at the time spelled "Sinigaglia") on 26 September 1682.

He received his higher education at the Collegio Clementino in Rome, where he excelled in his studies. However, despite his later mathematical achievements, he initially displayed an aversion to mathematics during his time at the college. It was only after completing his studies there that he turned to mathematics, mastering it independently. In 1705 he married Francesca Conciatti, by whom he had twelve children. One, Giovanni Fagnano, was also well-known as a mathematician. Another of Fagnano's children became a Benedictine nun.

His knowledge of architecture caused Benedict XIV to call him to Rome in 1748 to examine the cupola of St. Peter's, which was rapidly disintegrating. As a reward for his services, Pope Benedict XIV commissioned the publication of his complete works.

In 1721, Fagnano was made a count by Louis XV; in 1723, he was appointed gonfaloniere of Senigallia and elected to the Royal Society of London; He was also a member to the Prussian Academy of Sciences and was proposed for the French Academy of Sciences in 1766 but died before he could be elected. Fagnano died in his hometown on 18 May 1766, and was buried in the church of Santa Maria Maddalena, Senigallia.

== Mathematical work ==
Trained as a philosopher and theologian, Fagnano taught himself mathematics after his college studies. He was chiefly interested in geometry and in the study of algebraic equations. Most of his important researches were published in the scientific journal Giornale de' Letterati d'Italia.

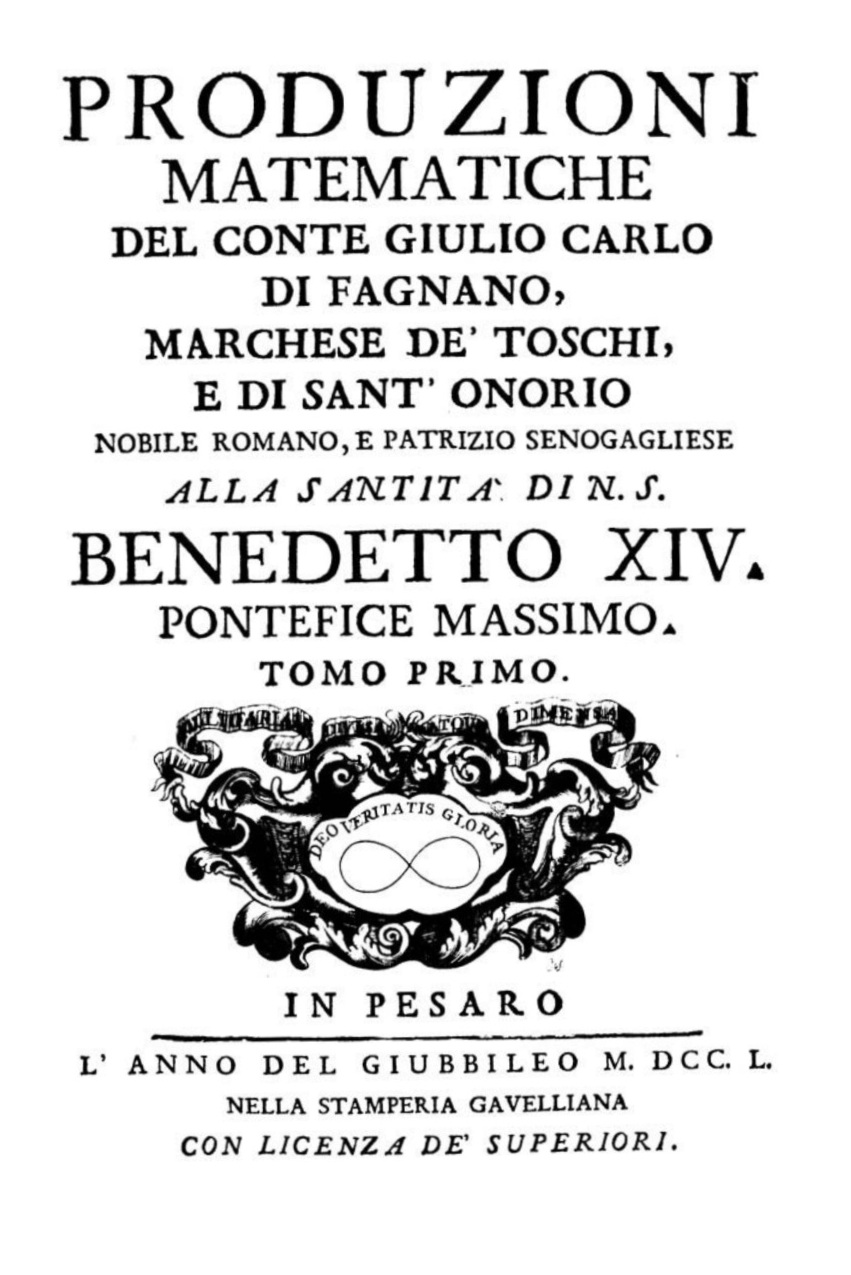
Produzioni matematiche, 1750

Fagnano is best known for investigations on the length and division of arcs of certain curves, especially the lemniscate (cf. lemniscate elliptic functions); this seems also to have been in his own estimation his most important work, since he had the figure of the lemniscate with the inscription "Multifariam divisa atque dimensa Deo veritatis gloria" engraved on the title-page of his Produzioni Matematiche, which he published in two volumes (Pesaro, 1750), and dedicated to Pope Benedict XIV. The same figure and words "Deo veritatis gloria" also appear on his tomb.

Failing to rectify the ellipse or hyperbola, Fagnano attempted to determine arcs whose difference is rectifiable. The word "rectifiable" meant at that time that the length can be found explicitly, which is different from its modern meaning. He also pointed out the remarkable analogy existing between the integrals which represent the arc of a circle and the arc of a lemniscate. He also proved the formula

$$\pi = 2i\log{1-i\over 1+i}$$

where $i$ stands for $\sqrt{-1}$.

Fagnano's works on elliptical functions gained him international reputation. In 1751, Maupertuis submitted his work to the German Academy of Sciences at Berlin for consideration of Fagnano as a foreign member. Leonhard Euler was assigned the task of evaluating the quality of Fagnano's works. He was so impressed by Fagnano's discoveries in the theory of the lemniscate that he immediately commenced his own research in the same direction. Euler developed and generalised Fagnano's methods and results, in particular giving the famous addition formula for elliptic integrals. Fagnano corresponded with the leading mathematicians of the day, most notably Luigi Guido Grandi, Jacopo Riccati, Thomas Leseur, and François Jacquier; his work was highly praised by Bernard Le Bovier de Fontenelle, the permanent secretary of the French Academy of Sciences. Joseph-Louis Lagrange dedicated his first scientific publication to him.

== Works ==
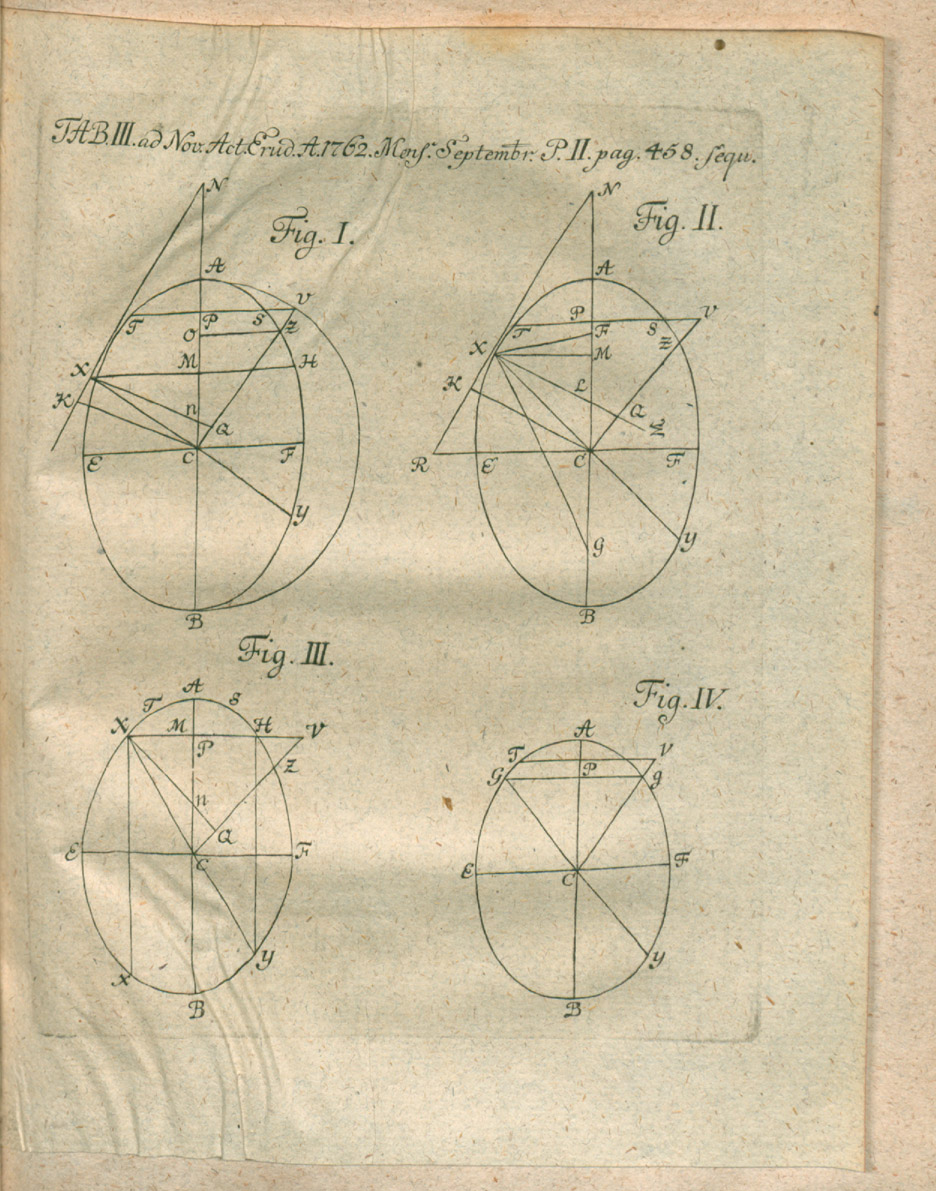
Illustratiom from Illustratio theorematis actis lipsiensibus... published in Acta Eruditorum, 1762

- Vito Volterra; Gino Loria; Dionisio Gambioli, eds. (1911). Opere matematiche del marchese Giulio Carlo de’ Toschi di Fagnano. 2 vols. Rome: Società editrice Dante Alighieri.

== Bibliography ==
- Watson, G. N. (1933). "The Marquis and the Land-Agent; A Tale of the Eighteenth Century". The Mathematical Gazette. 17 (222): 5–17. JSTOR 3607944.
