= Babcock House =

Babcock House may refer to:

- Dr. Raymond Babcock House, Willits, California, listed on the National Register of Historic Places (NRHP) in Mendocino County
- Simeon Babcock House, Manistee, Michigan, listed on the NRHP in Manistee County
- Capt. Francis Babcock House, Absecon City, New Jersey, listed on the NRHP in Atlantic County
- Dr. John Babcock House, Selkirk, New York, listed on the NRHP
- Babcock-Shattuck House, Syracuse, New York, listed on the NRHP in Onondaga County
- Charles C. Babcock House, Oregon City, Oregon, listed on the NRHP in Clackamas County
- Babcock House (Charlestown, Rhode Island), listed on the NRHP
- Babcock-Smith House, Westerly, Rhode Island, listed on the NRHP
- Babcock-Macomb House, Washington, D.C., listed on the NRHP
- Weston-Babcock House, Necedah, Wisconsin, listed on the NRHP in Juneau County
- Havilah Babcock House, Neenah, Wisconsin, listed on the NRHP in Winnebago County

== See also ==
- Babcock Block, Worcester, Massachusetts, listed on the NRHP
- Babcock Building, South Carolina State Hospital, Columbia, South Carolina, listed on the NRHP
- Babcock Site, Waldron, Missouri, listed on the NRHP
- Babcock Theatre, Billings, Montana, listed on the NRHP
