= National Aquarium (Baltimore) =

Aquarium in Baltimore, Maryland, U.S.

National Aquarium in Baltimore

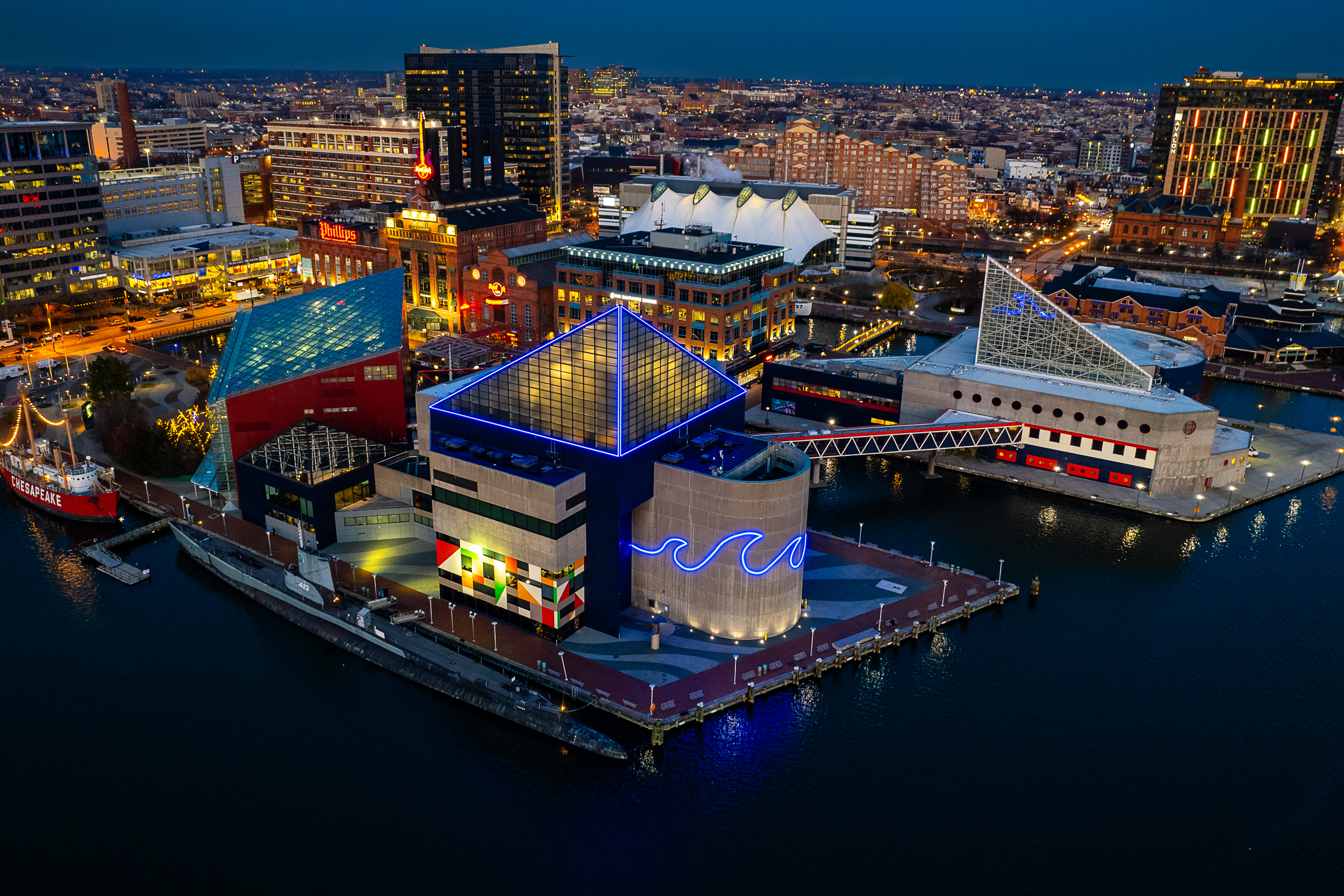
- The National Aquarium (angular original building with glass pyramid top of 1981, middle, and 2005 north extension to its left) lies near two of four historic museum / exhibit ships of the Baltimore Maritime Museum on Piers 3 and 4 in the Inner Harbor area of Baltimore, including World War II submarine USS Torsk and Lightship Chesapeake.
- Interactive map of National Aquarium in Baltimore
- 39.284398°N 76.606936°W
- Date opened: August 8, 1981; 45 years ago
- Location: 501 East Pratt Street; Baltimore, Maryland 21202 United States
- Land area: 250,000 sq ft (23,000 m^{2})
- No. of animals: 17,000+
- No. of species: 750+
- Volume of largest tank: 1,300,000 US gallons (4,900,000 L)
- Total volume of tanks: More than 2,200,000 US gallons (8,300,000 L)
- Annual visitors: 1.5 million (2009)
- Memberships: AZA
- Public transit: at Shot Tower (0.5 mi northeast); BaltimoreLink routes Blue, Brown, Yellow, 54, 63, 65, 154; Charm City Circulator Orange Route; Baltimore Water Taxi
- Website: www.aqua.org

The National Aquarium—also known as the National Aquarium in Baltimore or Baltimore Aquarium—is a nonprofit public aquarium located at 501 East Pratt Street on Pier 3 in the Inner Harbor area of Downtown Baltimore, Maryland, United States. Constructed during a period of urban renewal in Baltimore, the aquarium opened on August 8, 1981. The aquarium has an annual attendance of 1.5 million visitors and is the largest tourism attraction in the state of Maryland. The aquarium holds more than 2,200,000 US gallons (8,300,000 L) of water, and has more than 17,000 specimens representing over 750 species. The National Aquarium's mission is to inspire conservation of the world's aquatic treasures. The aquarium's stated vision is to confront pressing issues facing global aquatic habitats through pioneering science, conservation, and educational programming.

The National Aquarium houses several exhibits including the Upland Tropical Rain Forest, a multiple-story Atlantic Coral Reef, an open-ocean shark tank, and Australia: Wild Extremes, which won the "Best Exhibit" award from the Association of Zoos and Aquariums in 2008. The aquarium also has a "4D Immersion Theater." The aquarium opened a marine mammal pavilion on the adjacent south end of Pier 4 in 1990, and currently holds six Atlantic bottlenose dolphins. Of the six, five were born at the National Aquarium, one was born at another American aquarium.

In 2003, the National Aquarium and the much older and independent National Aquarium in Washington, D.C., formed an alliance to operate as a single National Aquarium with two sites. This arrangement continued until 2013, when the Washington location closed permanently.

== History ==
The aquarium began in the mid-1970s when then-mayor William Donald Schaefer, and the Commissioner of the city Department of Housing and Community Development, Robert C. Embry, inspired by a visit to the New England Aquarium on the waterfront of Boston, Massachusetts, conceived and championed the idea of an aquarium as a vital component of Baltimore's overall downtown and Inner Harbor redevelopment scheme. In 1976, Baltimore City residents supported the idea of an aquarium by voting for it on a bond loan referendum, and the groundbreaking for the facility took place on old Pier 3 facing East Pratt Street, just east of the newly completed World Trade Center in the city's Inner Harbor on August 8, 1978.

Although no federal funds were used for its construction, the United States Congress later designated the facility as the "national aquarium" in 1979. The aquarium opened to the public on August 8, 1981, after three years of construction, and one year after the booming festival marketplace of the two Harborplace shopping pavilions further west conceived by nationally famous, local developer James Rouse.

The National Aquarium, Baltimore's initial conceptual design, architecture and exhibit design was led by Peter Chermayeff of Peter Chermayeff LLC while he was at CambridgeSeven. The conceptual, architectural, and exhibit design for the Glass Pavilion expansion was led by Bobby C. Poole while at Chermayeff, Sollogub & Poole. After two decades, construction began on the Glass Pavilion north extension on September 5, 2002, and it opened to the public on December 16, 2005. It measures 64,500 sq ft (5,990 m^{2}), and is 120 ft (37 m) high at the tallest point.

== Conservation, research, and green practices ==
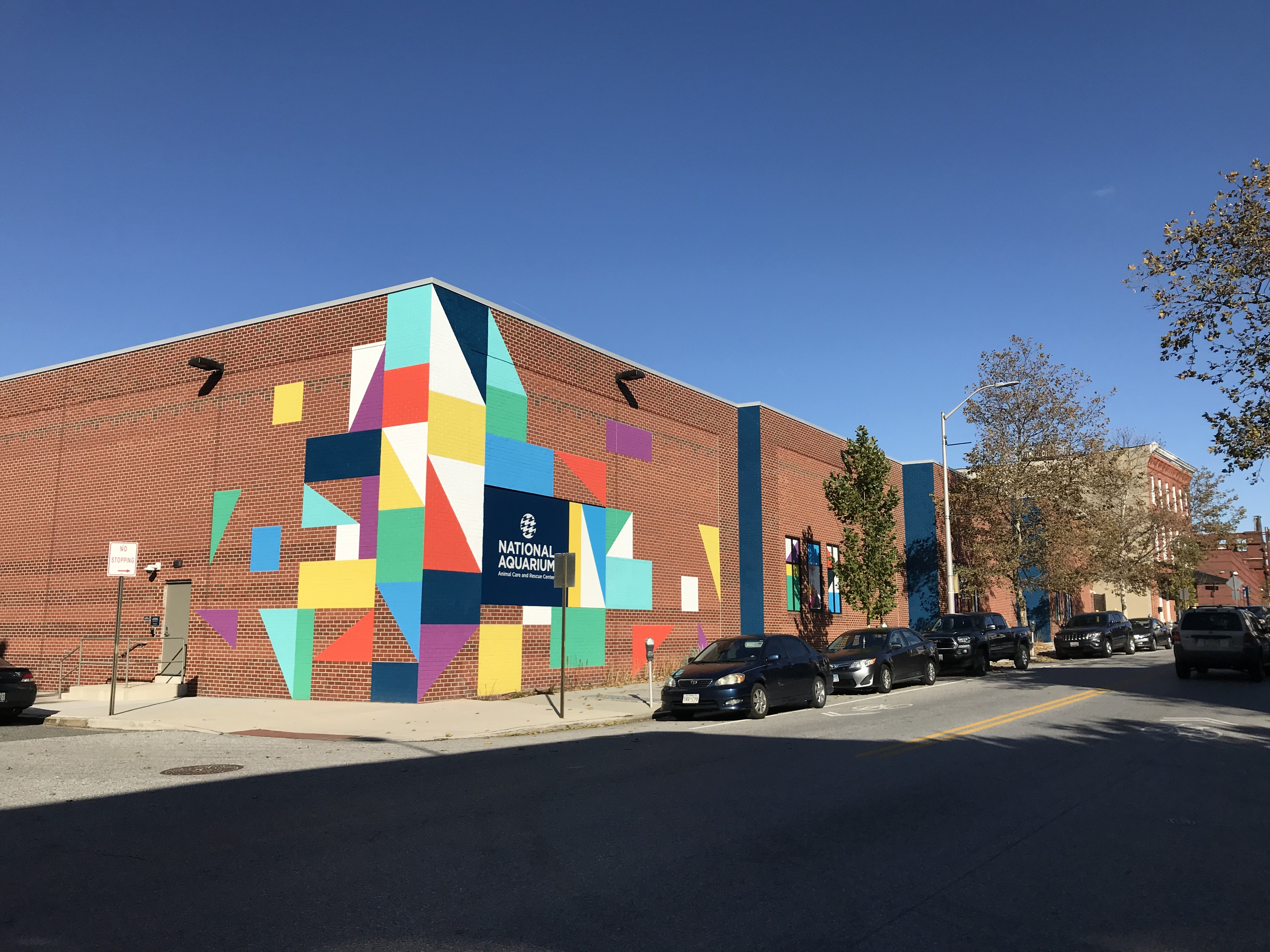
National Aquarium Animal Care and Rescue Center on Fayette Street

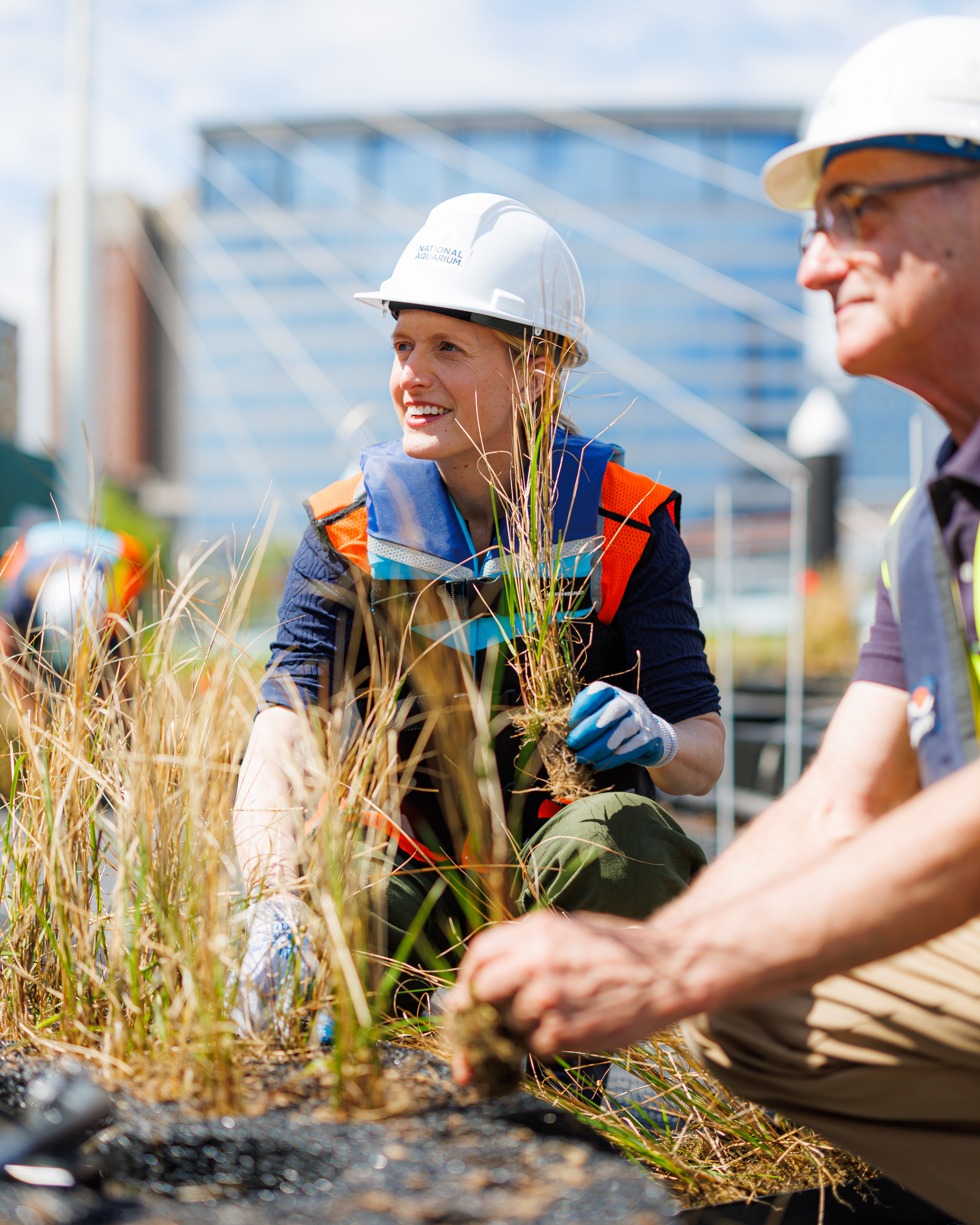
Harbor Wetland planting.

The National Aquarium was selected as the National Wildlife Federation's Maryland affiliate in 2011. The aquarium conducts conservation efforts through events to clean up the Chesapeake Bay Wetlands, and the aquarium's Marine Animal Rescue Program (MARP), which rescues, rehabilitates, and releases marine mammals. MARP has successfully rescued, treated, and returned seals, dolphins, porpoises, pilot whales, pygmy sperm whales, sea turtles, and a manatee to their natural habitats.

The National Aquarium Conservation Center (est. 2009) leads the aquarium's research efforts in resolving critical issues currently impacting coastal ecosystems and watersheds, ocean health, ecological aquaculture, and informs issues of environmental policy and advocacy through conservation research focused on aquatic ecosystems. Some of the center's projects include "The Chesapeake Bay Initiative", tracking mercury levels through the food chain in wild and captive bottlenose dolphins, and assessing chronic natural resource damages from the BP oil spill in the Gulf of Mexico.

In 2011, The National Aquarium was honored with the Maryland Green Registry Leadership Award, as an organization that shows "a strong commitment to sustainable practices, measurable results, and continuous improvement" and was recognized by the Baltimore Business Journal and Smart CEO Magazine for exceptional green business practices in 2009.

A 4.3 MW solar farm in Cambridge supplies about 40% of the power for the National Aquarium, and saves about 1,300 metric tons of carbon dioxide during the summer. Energy efficiency upgrades in 2015 saved an additional 3,200 tons of CO_{2} over the summer.

== Exhibits ==
=== Pier 3 Pavilion ===
This building consists of five levels accessible by both escalator and elevator, with the exception of guests using strollers. Guests with toddlers must carry them. Each floor features several exhibits centred around a main theme. This building also contains two large tanks, one simulating an Atlantic coral reef, and the other representing the open ocean.

==== Level 1: Blacktip Reef ====
The Central Tray, as it was originally known, has gone through many iterations since the original building opened in 1981. Originally, it was a marine mammal exhibit that had bottlenose dolphins collected from the Gulf of Mexico and eventually later on, beluga whales, but when Pier 4 opened with a slightly larger tank, the animals were moved there leaving the central tray without an exhibit. They tried California sea lions for a short time but it proved to be a problem with their constant noise echoing throughout the pavilion. In 1991 The exhibit became Wings in the Water, which included several species of stingray until 2013, when it became Blacktip Reef. For 30 years, the tray remained the same - a bare concrete bottom, painted a light blue color. The 'pit' was temporarily covered for a time in 2008–9 after that section of the exhibit began to deteriorate. The exhibit was then lined with sand to disguise the 'pit' cover. While aesthetically pleasing, the weight of the sand ended up causing the collapse of the cover itself and was then removed. Originally, the bump out window was obviously not present and the underwater viewing area was quite dark. The viewing windows were the same shape and size as the two windows flanking either side of the bump out window today. Above, the guest pathways were the same, minus the glass siding. On the exit side of Blacktip Reef, an entire guest walkway was cut back considerably to create the sandbar section of the exhibit. Also removed was a cylindrical tank which held numerous exhibits over the years.

Renovations to the tray were needed for years even before Blacktip Reef was even conceived. Originally, it was to be renovated and turned back into the same stingray exhibit, but soon evolved into what the Aquarium has today. This 265,000-US-gallon (1,000,000 L) habitat, replicating an Indo-Pacific reef landscape (living corals are exhibited elsewhere in the National Aquarium), can be seen from many vantage points, including a new floor-to-ceiling pop-out viewing window. It contains 69 species of fish including blacktip reef sharks, emperor angelfish, harlequin tuskfish, humphead wrasse, reticulate whipray, blotched fantail ray, spotted unicornfish, tasselled wobbegong and zebra shark. One of the largest animals in the exhibit was Calypso, a 500-pound green sea turtle that was rescued off the shore of Long Island in 2000. Her left front flipper had become infected and required amputation in order to save her life. Calypso was introduced to the exhibit in 2002 and died on February 3, 2020.

In October 2020, the National Aquarium announced its acquisition of another green sea turtle, Kai, who had suffered injuries in a collision with a boat that left her unable to dive for food. Kai had been rescued in 2018 and treated at the South Carolina Aquarium, from which she was later transferred to the Animal Care and Rescue Center at the National Aquarium for long-term physical rehabilitation. In late 2025, she was introduced into the exhibit after 5 years of rehabilitation

==== Level 2: Maryland: Mountains to the Sea ====
This level features animals that are native to Maryland. The four exhibits create the illusion that the viewer is traveling down a Maryland stream from its source in the Allegheny Mountains, to a tidal marsh, to a coastal beach, and finally ending at the Atlantic shelf. Featured animals include wood turtle, American bullfrog, and rosyside dace in the Allegheny Stream, diamondback terrapin, striped blenny, and sheepshead minnow in the Tidal Marsh, striped burrfish and lookdown in the Coastal Beach, and clearnose skate and summer flounder in the Atlantic Shelf exhibit.

==== Level 3: Surviving Through Adaptation, Living Seashore ====
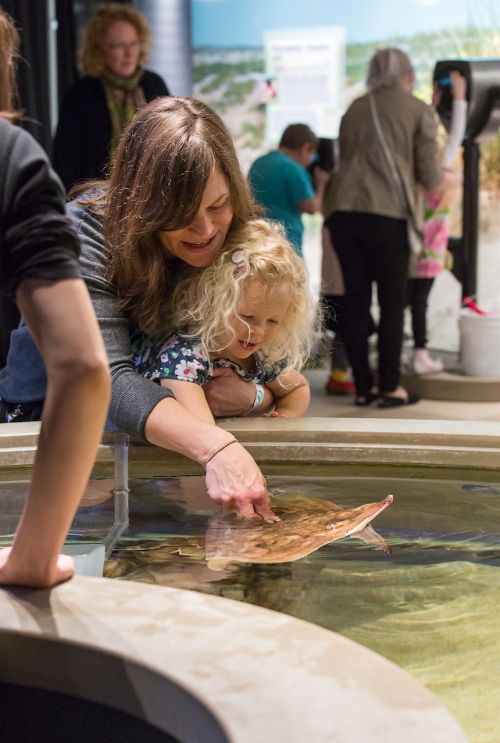
Living Seashore exhibit features touch pools.

This level features fish that possess adaptations that are needed to survive in their various environments. For example, the electric eel has the rare ability to shock its prey with electricity and the peacock mantis shrimp uses its strong claws to punch its predators. Featured animals include electric eel, lined seahorse, longnose gar, peacock mantis shrimp and Spotfin butterflyfish.

Living Seashore is a 5,331-US-gallon (20,180 L) exhibit on the Atlantic seashore featuring two touch pools and a variety of hands-on experiences, giving guests the opportunity to explore the ever-changing Mid-Atlantic shoreline.

Guests can interact with animals which include little skate, Atlantic stingray, Atlantic horseshoe crab, knobbed whelk, giant Pacific octopus, and moon jelly.

==== Level 4: North Atlantic to the Pacific, Amazon River Forest ====
This level displays several aquatic habitats, including a sea cliffs exhibit, which houses seabirds like Atlantic puffins and black guillemots; a Pacific coral reef exhibit housing Bangaii cardinalfish, percula clownfish and yellow tangs; a kelp forest exhibit with garibaldis, horn shark and several types of starfish; and an Amazon River forest exhibit, in which animals can be seen down in the water and up in the overlying foliage. The exhibit replaced a former touch tank and children’s zone known as Children’s Cove which housed several species of invertebrates from the Pacific Ocean. Animals housed in the Amazon River Forest include reptiles like Arrau turtles, emerald tree boas, smooth-fronted caimans, amphibians such as the giant waxy monkey frog and several types of fish like the blue discus, silver arowana and white-blotched river stingray.

==== Level 5: Upland Tropical Rain Forest, Hidden Life ====
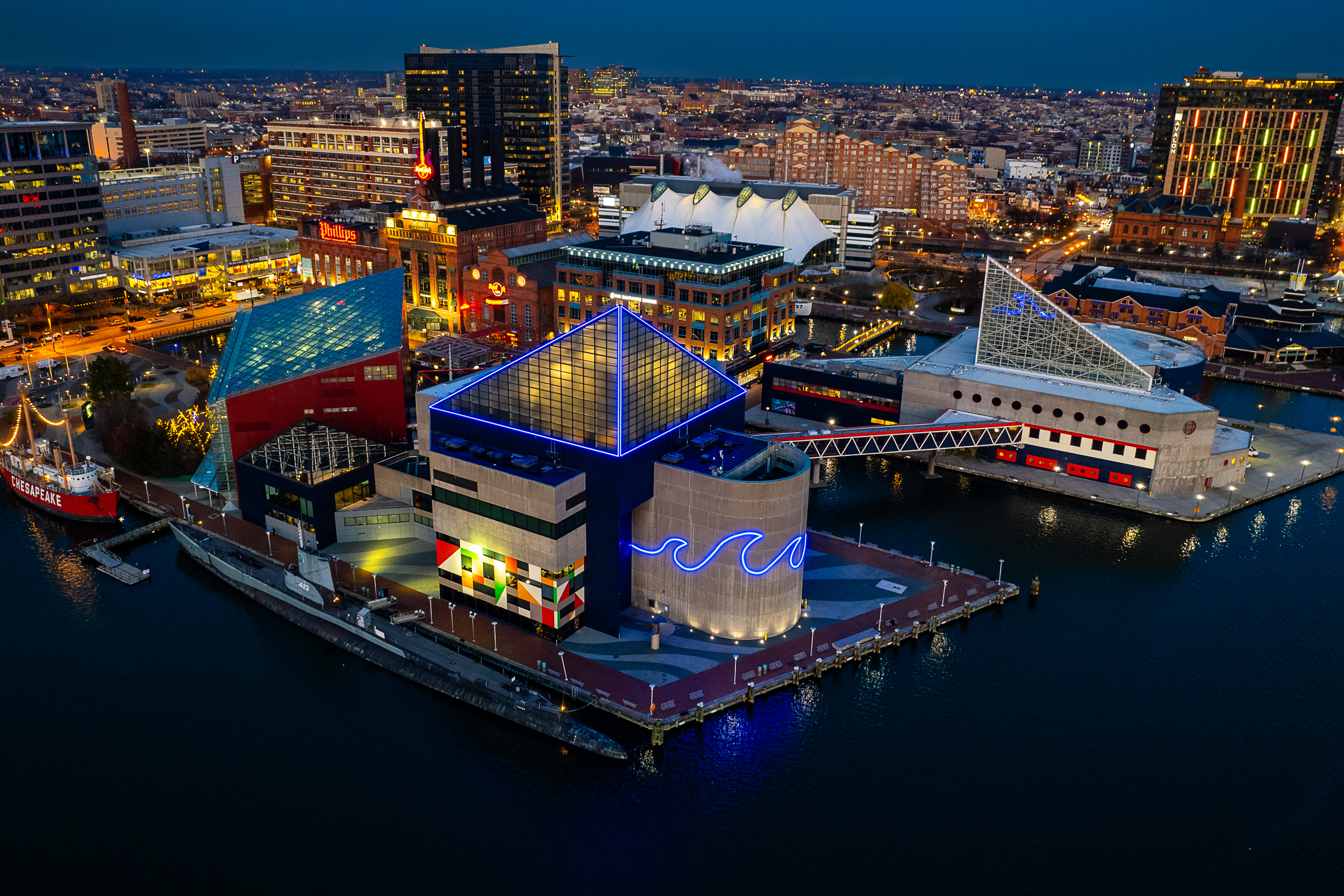
The aquarium added colored LED lights to the Upland Tropical Rainforest's glass pyramid in 2022.

Formerly known as The South American Rainforest, this level simulates the Amazon rainforest, and includes two elevated platforms for bird-watching and a cave of various glass-enclosed displays of reptiles and amphibians. Featured animals include:

- Golden lion tamarin
- Scarlet ibis
- Sunbittern
- Yellow-headed amazon parrot
- Blue-crowned motmot
- Turquoise tanager
- Blue poison dart frog
- Yellow-footed tortoise
- Linnaeus's two-toed sloth

==== Atlantic Coral Reef ====
This large 335,000-US-gallon (1,270,000 L) exhibit replicates the Atlantic coral reef, and is filled with more than 100 exotic species that would be found anywhere from closer to shore to out into the trench and open ocean, including a green moray eel, queen triggerfish, black grouper, blacknose shark, southern stingray, Atlantic tarpon, spotfin butterflyfish, spot-fin porcupinefish, and a Kemp's ridley sea turtle. Originally the exhibit had several species of other animals like spotted eagle ray, barracuda, and a hawksbill sea turtle.

==== Shark Alley: Atlantic Predators ====
Originally Known as The Open Ocean, this large, 225,000-US-gallon (850,000 L), ring shaped exhibit originally called open ocean replicates the deeper portions of the Atlantic coral reef, and is filled with larger reef animals such as roughtail stingray, sandbar shark, sand tiger shark, nurse shark, crevalle jack and largetooth sawfish. This exhibit formerly held lemon shark and several species of gamefish and rays.

=== Pier 4 Pavilion ===
This smaller building, opened in December 1990, features the marine mammal exhibit, which is home to Atlantic bottlenose dolphins in a 1,300,000-US-gallon (4,900,000 L) facility. It also holds a temporary exhibit on assorted jellyfish called "Jellies Invasion: Oceans Out of Balance".

==== Dolphin Discovery ====
This exhibit currently houses the aquarium's six bottlenose dolphins. Guests can watch training, feeding, and play times with the dolphins and interact with dolphin experts.

The dolphin colony consists of two males (Foster, Beau) and four females (Spirit, Chesapeake, Bayley, Jade), the youngest being Bayley, who was born in 2008. Chesapeake was the first dolphin born at the aquarium in 1992 and is the oldest of the colony.

In June 2016, the National Aquarium announced plans to construct a sanctuary in Florida or the Caribbean for its colony of bottlenose dolphins. The new sanctuary would be roughly between 50 and 100 times the size of the current dolphin exhibit. "The sanctuary would be the first of its kind in North America and will provide the dolphins with a protected, seaside habitat, creating a new option for how dolphins can thrive in human care," according to the Aquarium's website. As of late 2023, the Aquarium had narrowed down potential locations for the sanctuary to either the U.S. Virgin Islands or Puerto Rico, and planned to relocate the dolphins there by 2026.

==== Jellies Invasion: Oceans Out of Balance ====
Opened in 2009, this temporary exhibit in the Pier 4 Pavilion building showcases nine different species of jellyfish, and also illustrates how these animals are important bioindicators, which means that they are sensitive to changes within their environment, and therefore, serve as an early warning sign that changes are occurring within an ecosystem, whether from pollution, invasive species, climate change, or other factors.

Featured animals Include:

- Atlantic sea nettle
- Bay nettle
- Flower hat jelly
- Pacific sea nettle
- Purple-striped jelly
- Lion's mane jellyfish
- Blue blubber jellyfish
- Upside-down jellyfish

==== Proposed master plan ====
In 2016, architect Jeanne Gang made a proposal to the National Aquarium to transform Pier 4 into a Chesapeake Bay themed exhibit to replace the Jellyfish and Dolphin exhibits. Even though details are sparse about this potential initiative, the new exhibits would include a waterfall, watershed, Lily pond, salt marsh, freshwater tidal, river and an open bay exhibit. Other parts of this plan include the creation of a "wetland" in between the two buildings and the transformation of Pier 3 into a collection of "hope spots" bringing the aquarium to 360,000 sq ft (33,000 m^{2}) of space in total.

=== Australia: Wild Extremes (Glass Pavilion) ===
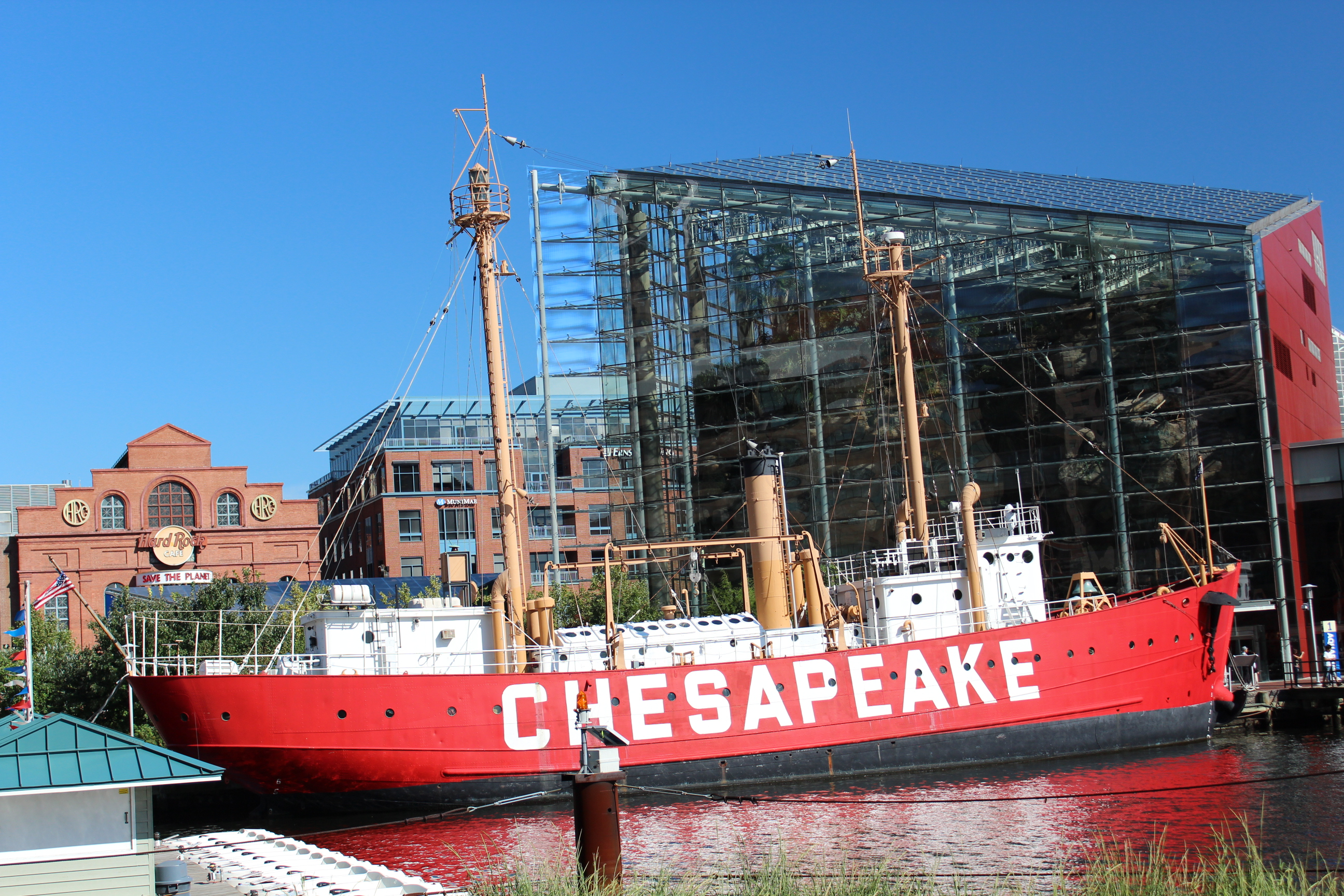
The Glass Pavilion showcasing the Australian exhibits

Like the Upland Tropical Rain Forest exhibit, this exhibit is structured like a large walk-in aviary, and allows many of the flying animals to roam freely throughout the exhibit. The exhibit represents a river gorge in the Northern Territory of Australia, and contains many pools in which Australian aquatic life can be found. It is designed to show the wild extremes faced by this particular part of Australia: fire, drought and flood. Guests can see more than 1,800 individual native animals including freshwater crocodiles, turtles, free-flying birds, snakes, and lizards.

The Aquarium completed the renovation and a multimillion-dollar expansion on December 16, 2005; the expanded portion is 64,500 square feet (5,990 m^{2}). The exterior of the expansion features an interactive area designed to teach visitors about bayscaping, bird-box building, the National Aquarium's nationally recognized Marine Animal Rescue Program, water quality testing, marine debris issues and wetland restoration.

Inside the expanded portion of the Aquarium, directly in the main entrance, is a 35-foot (11 m) waterfall that was modeled from an actual waterfall in a Maryland state park. The prominent display is also visible from outside the Aquarium. Also inside the expanded portion is a recreation of an Australian habitat. The Umbrawarra Gorge of Australia is carefully depicted inside the upper portion of the expanded building, and the exhibit depicts lands of fire, drought, and flood. Aboriginal artwork, based on actual work discovered in Australia, is also found in the gorge exhibit. These images depict aboriginal interpretations of the land that they live on.

Featured animals include:

- Laughing kookaburra
- Rainbow lorikeet
- Broad-shelled river turtle
- Irwin's turtle
- Kimberley long-necked turtle
- Pig-nosed turtle
- Northern death adder
- Spiny-tailed monitor
- Freshwater crocodile
- Australian lungfish
- Mouth almighty
- Common archerfish
- Barramundi

== Relationship with the National Aquarium, Washington, D.C. ==
The National Aquarium in Washington, D.C., was a separate aquarium housed in the lower level of the United States Department of Commerce Building, renamed the Herbert C. Hoover Building in 1981. Founded in 1873, it originally was distinct from the later National Aquarium in Baltimore, opened 108 years later and 40 miles (64 km) to the northeast of Washington. On September 4, 2003, the National Aquarium Society and the Board of Governors for the National Aquarium in Baltimore announced an alliance, in which the National Aquarium in Baltimore would operate the Washington, D.C., aquarium as well. The two aquariums became a single organizational entity known as the National Aquarium with two venues. A signing ceremony formally recognizing the alliance hosted by United States Secretary of Commerce Donald Evans took place at the Herbert C. Hoover Building. However, after only ten years of joint operations, the National Aquarium in Washington permananently closed its doors on September 30, 2013, after 128 years in operation – the first time it had closed since its opening in 1885 – to make room for physical renovations of Herbert C. Hoover Building. Approximately 1,700 animals from the Washington location's collection were moved north to the National Aquarium in Baltimore.

== Funding and staffing ==
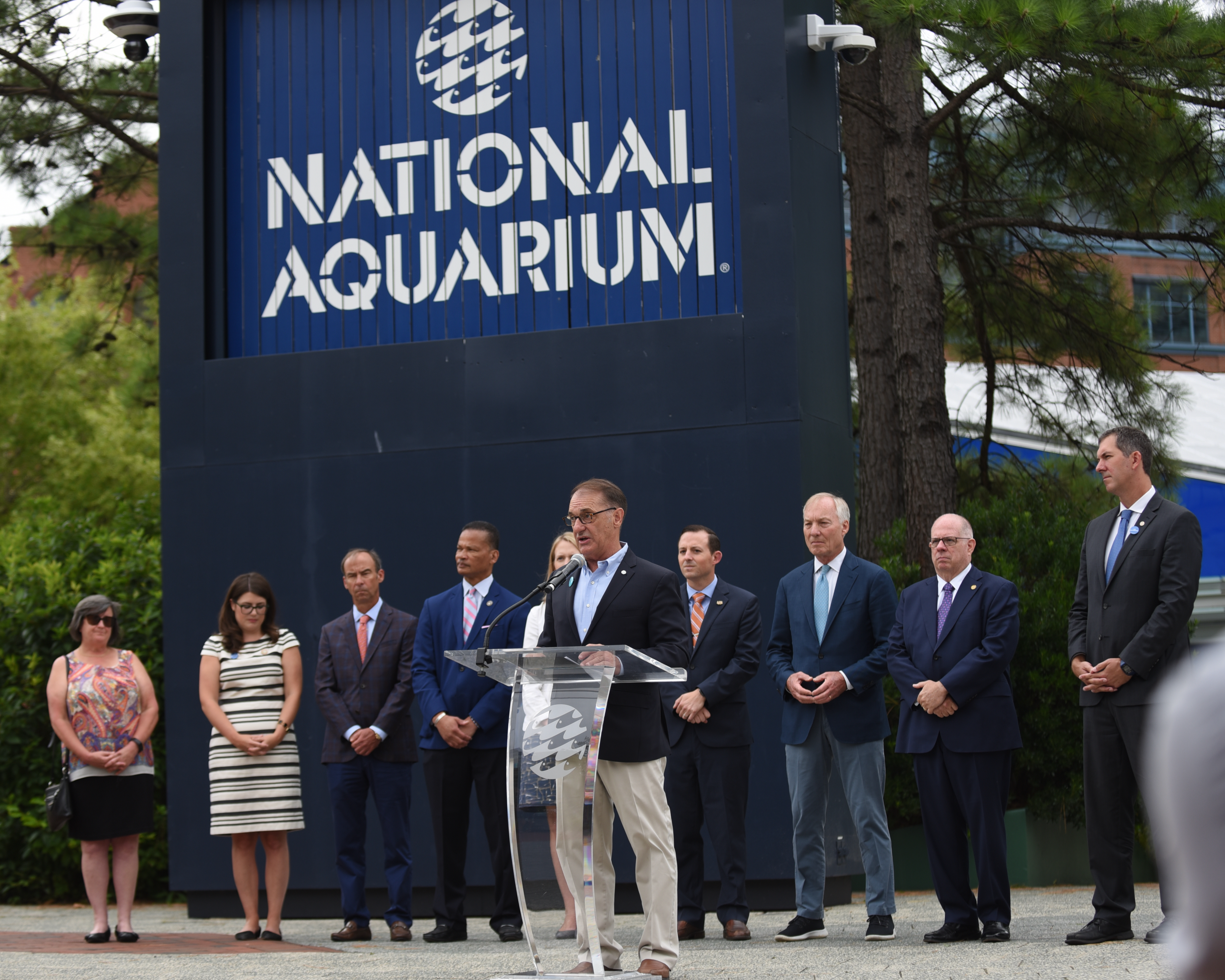
Government officials and staff at an event celebrating the 40th anniversary.

The National Aquarium is a nonprofit public aquarium. The aquarium building and the land upon which it is built are owned by the City of Baltimore, but the aquarium is managed by the nonprofit National Aquarium, Inc. which consists of a volunteer 25-member Board of Governors and larger Advisory Board, plus a full-time paid staff. The National Aquarium is run by CEO John Racanelli, who came into the position on June 20, 2011.

Under the terms of its management agreement with the City, the nonprofit corporation strives to remain self-supporting for operations. Details regarding funding, staffing, and programming are made available to the public within each year's annual report downloadable on the National Aquarium Institute's website.

== Recognition and awards ==
In 2012, the National Aquarium was named one of the best aquariums in the United States by the Travel Channel and also received the popular vote as one of the top five best aquariums to visit by the website 10best.com. Coastal Living magazine named the National Aquarium the #1 aquarium in the United States in 2009. In November 2006, the National Aquarium won a Best of Baltimore award from the Baltimore City Paper as the "Best Over Priced Destination for Families." In September 2011, the City Paper Reader's Poll awarded the National Aquarium with the title of "Best Attraction" and the "Best Place to Take Kids".

== Gallery ==
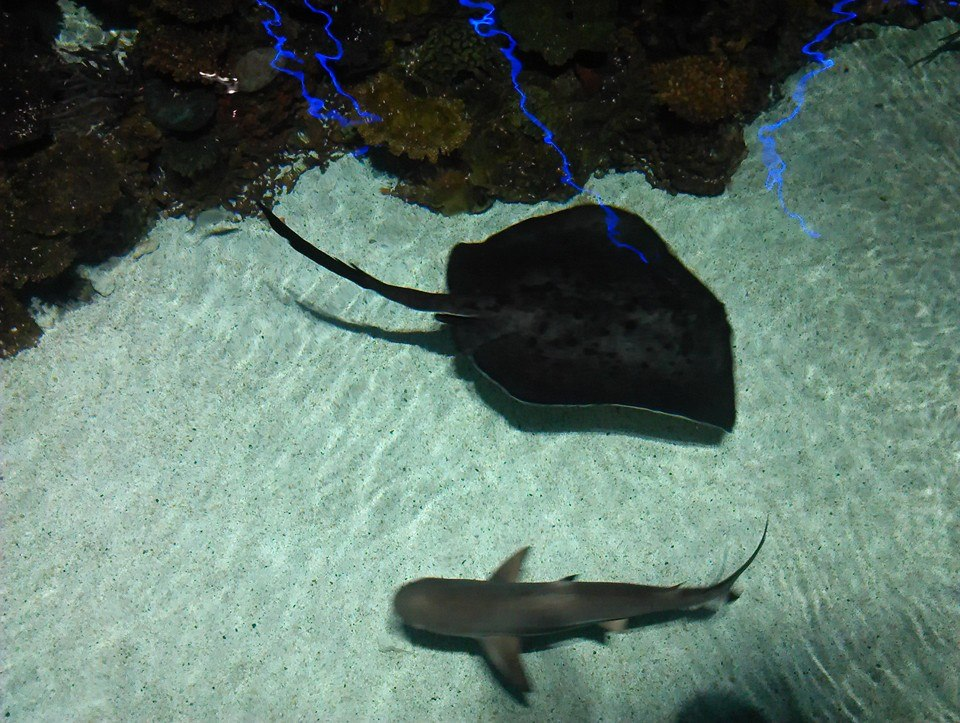
Blacktip Reef with stingrays and Blacktip reef sharks

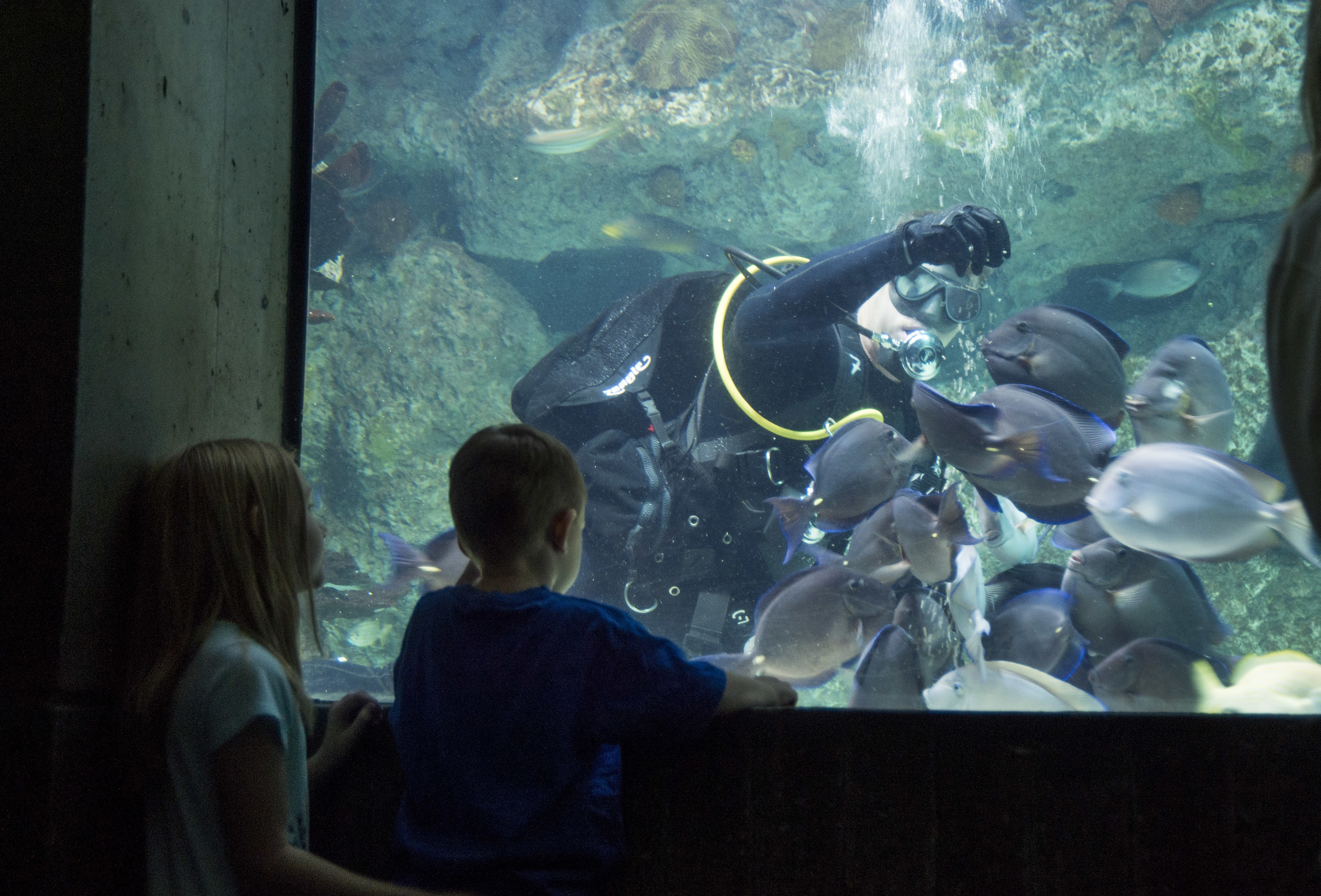
A diver feeding in a tank

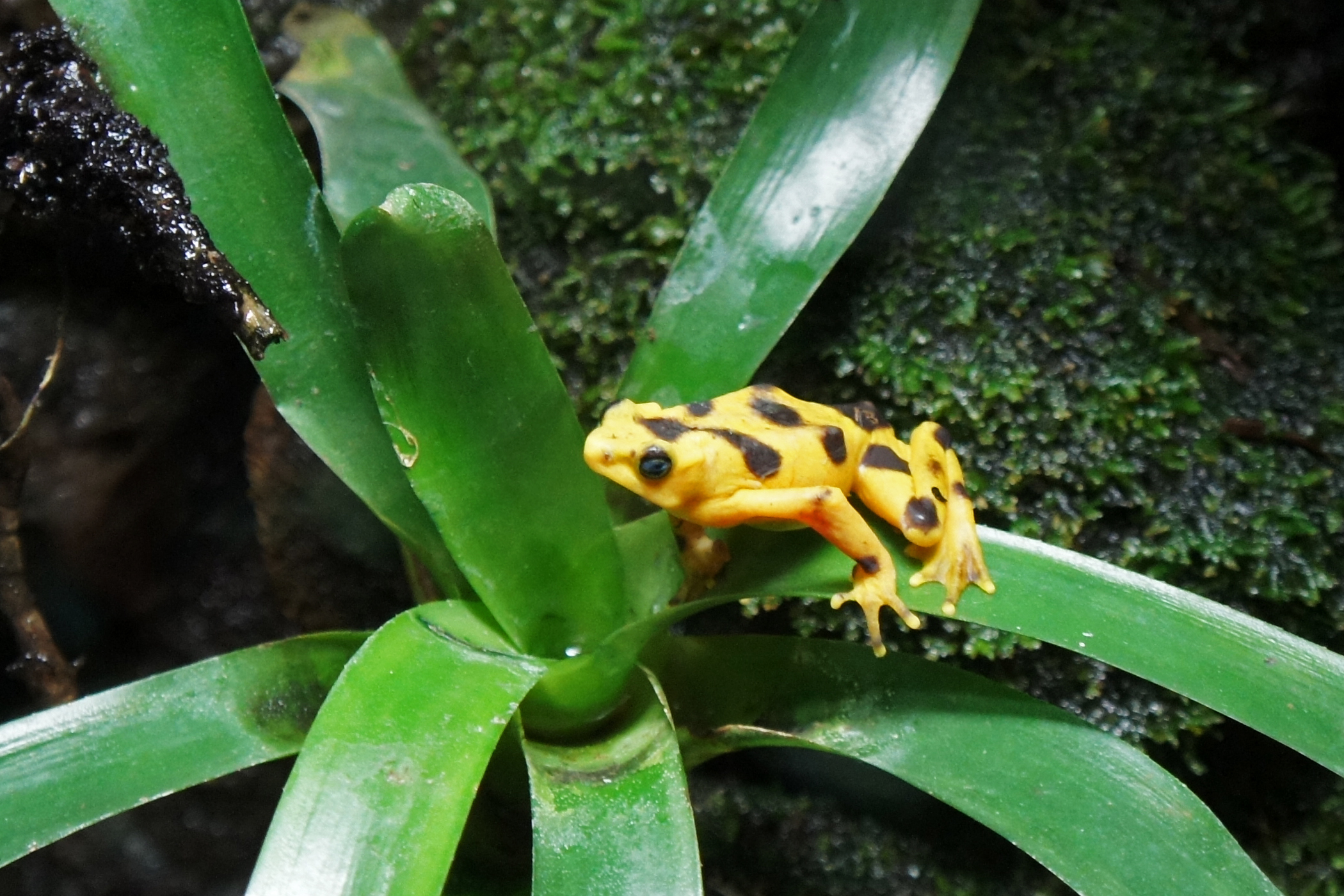
Panamanian golden frog

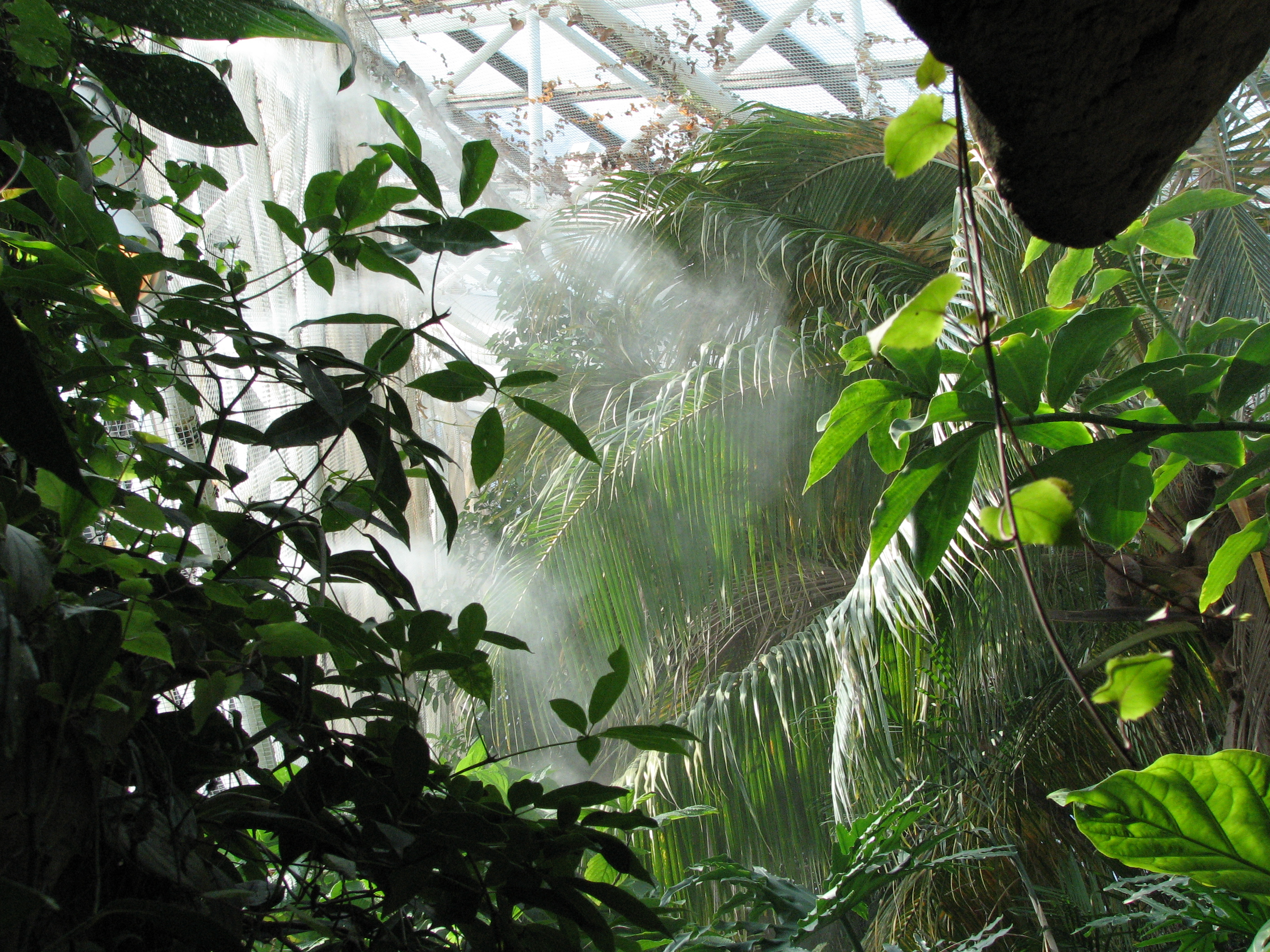
Rainforest located at the top of Pier 3

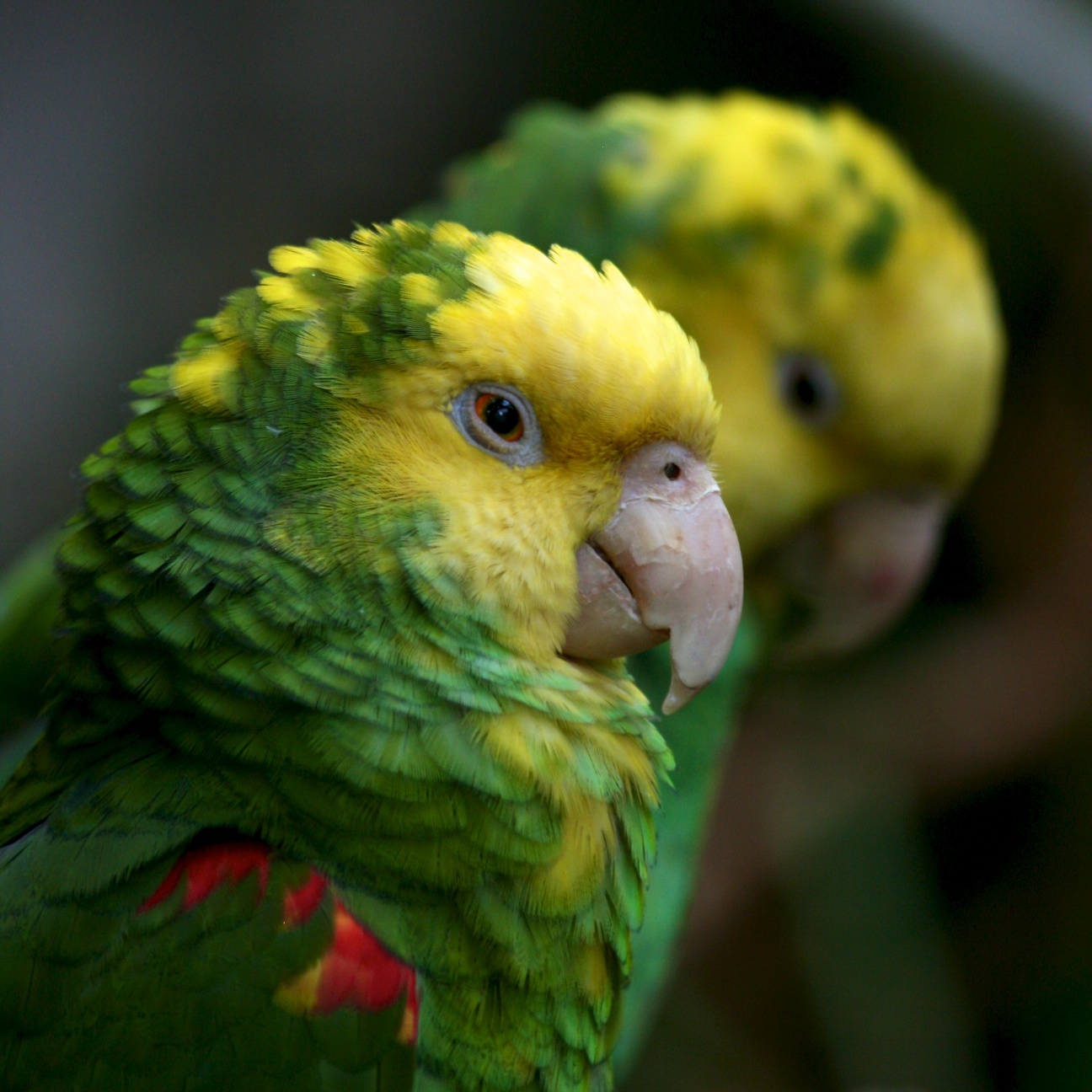
Yellow-headed Amazon parrot

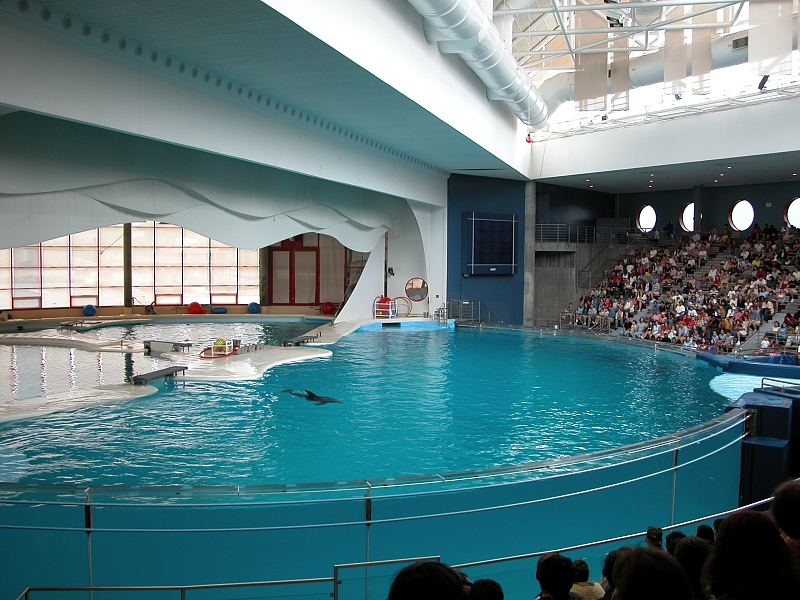
The Marine Mammal Pavilion on Pier 4

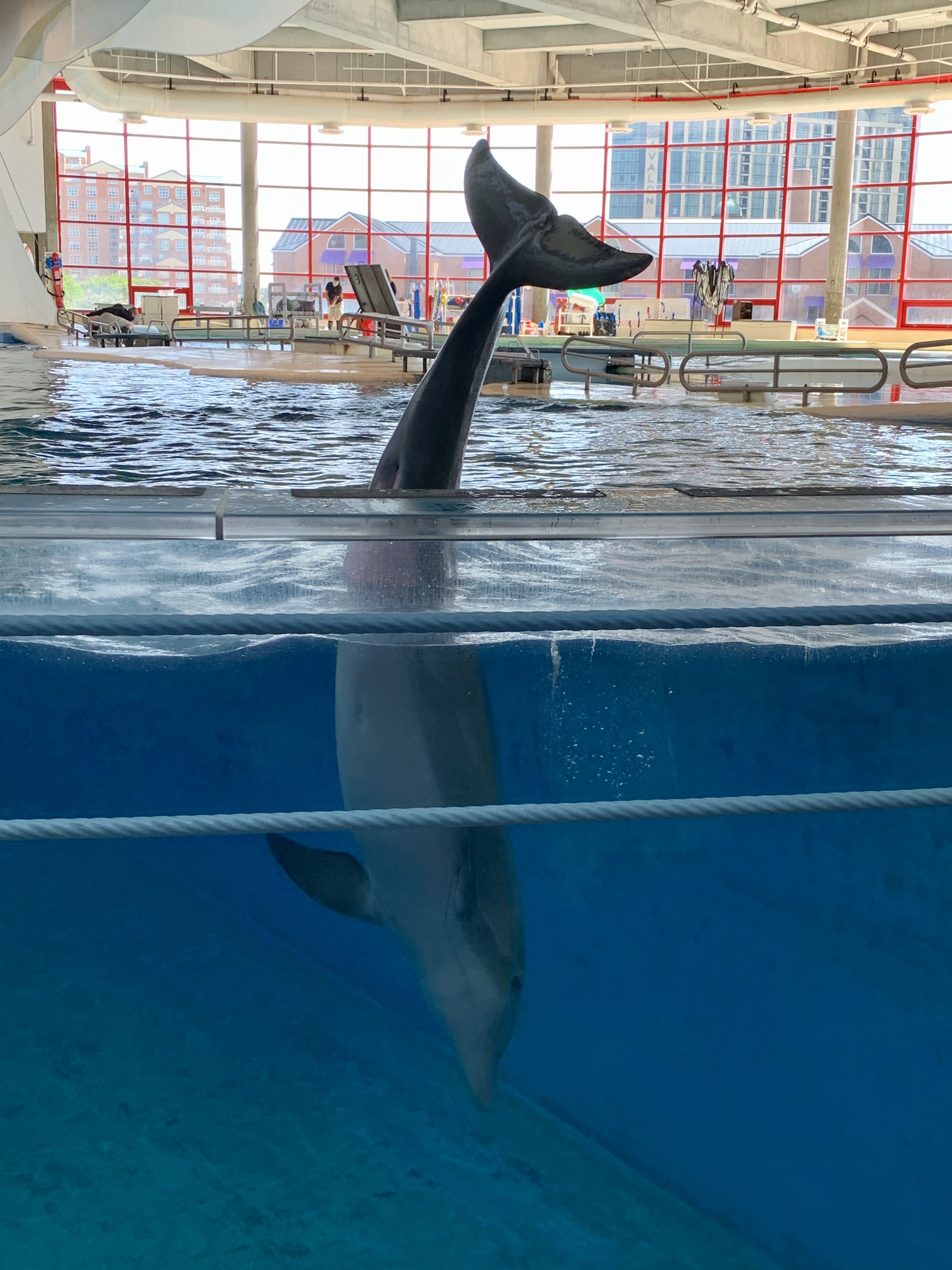
Atlantic bottlenose dolphin

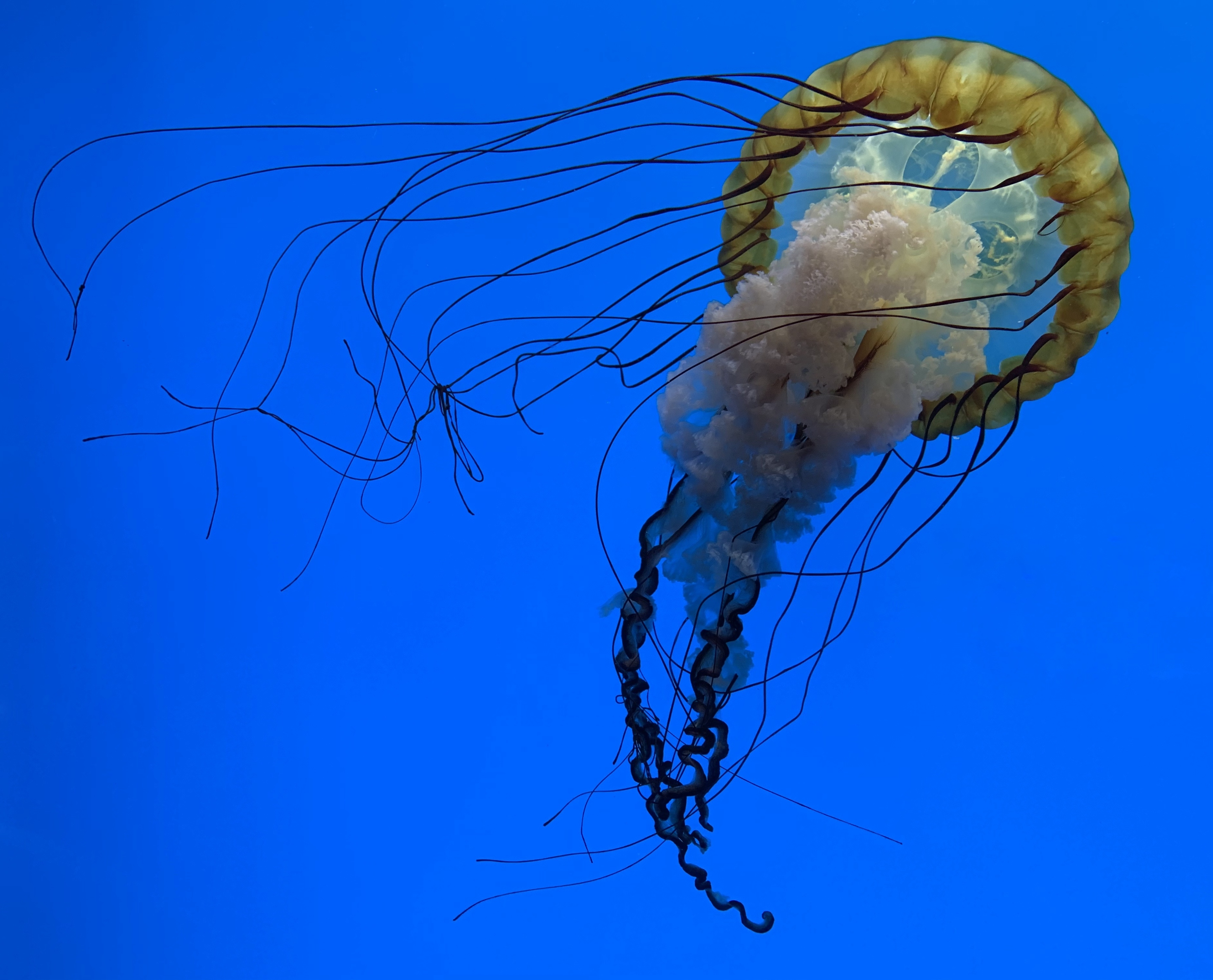
Pacific sea nettle

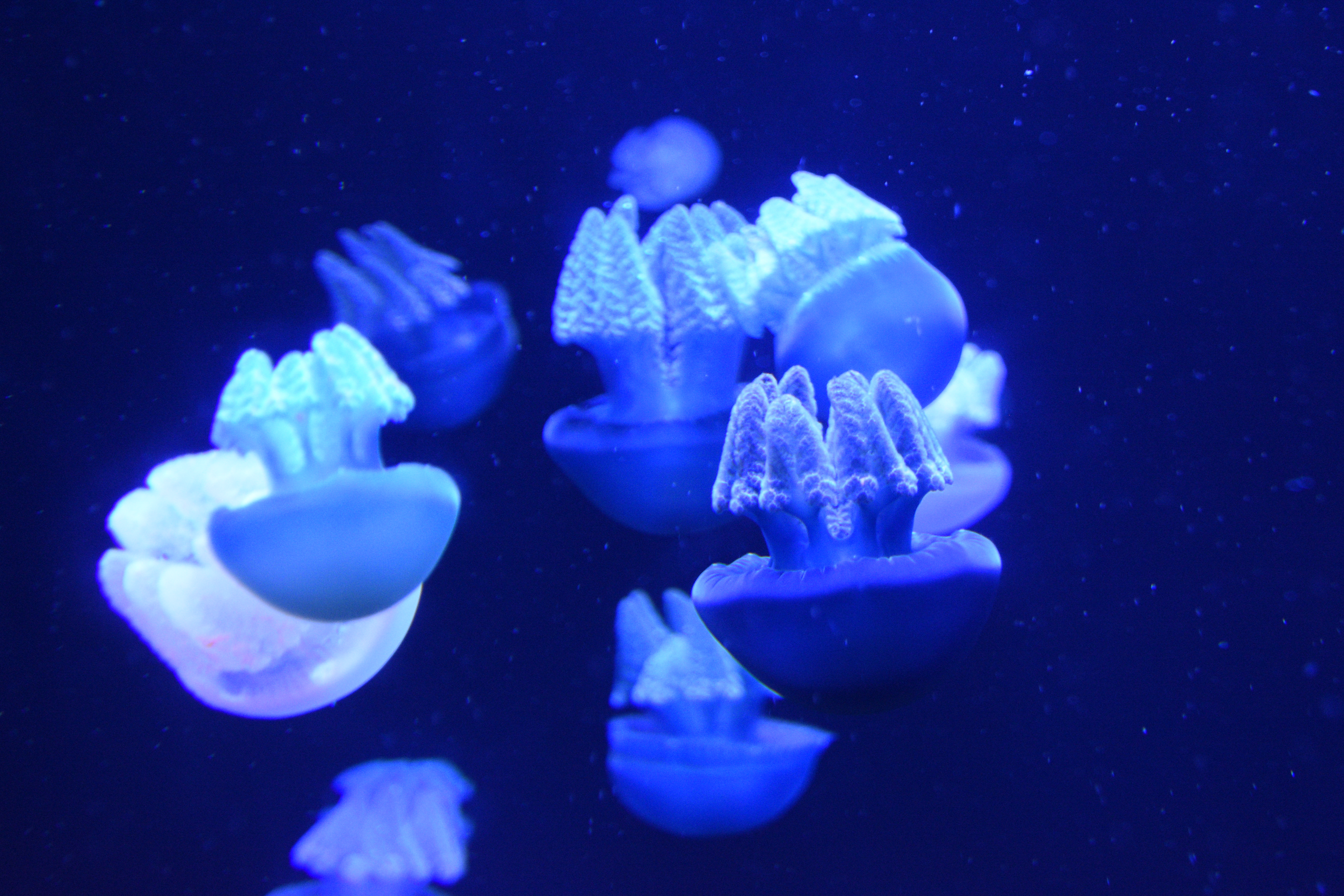
Jelly blubbers

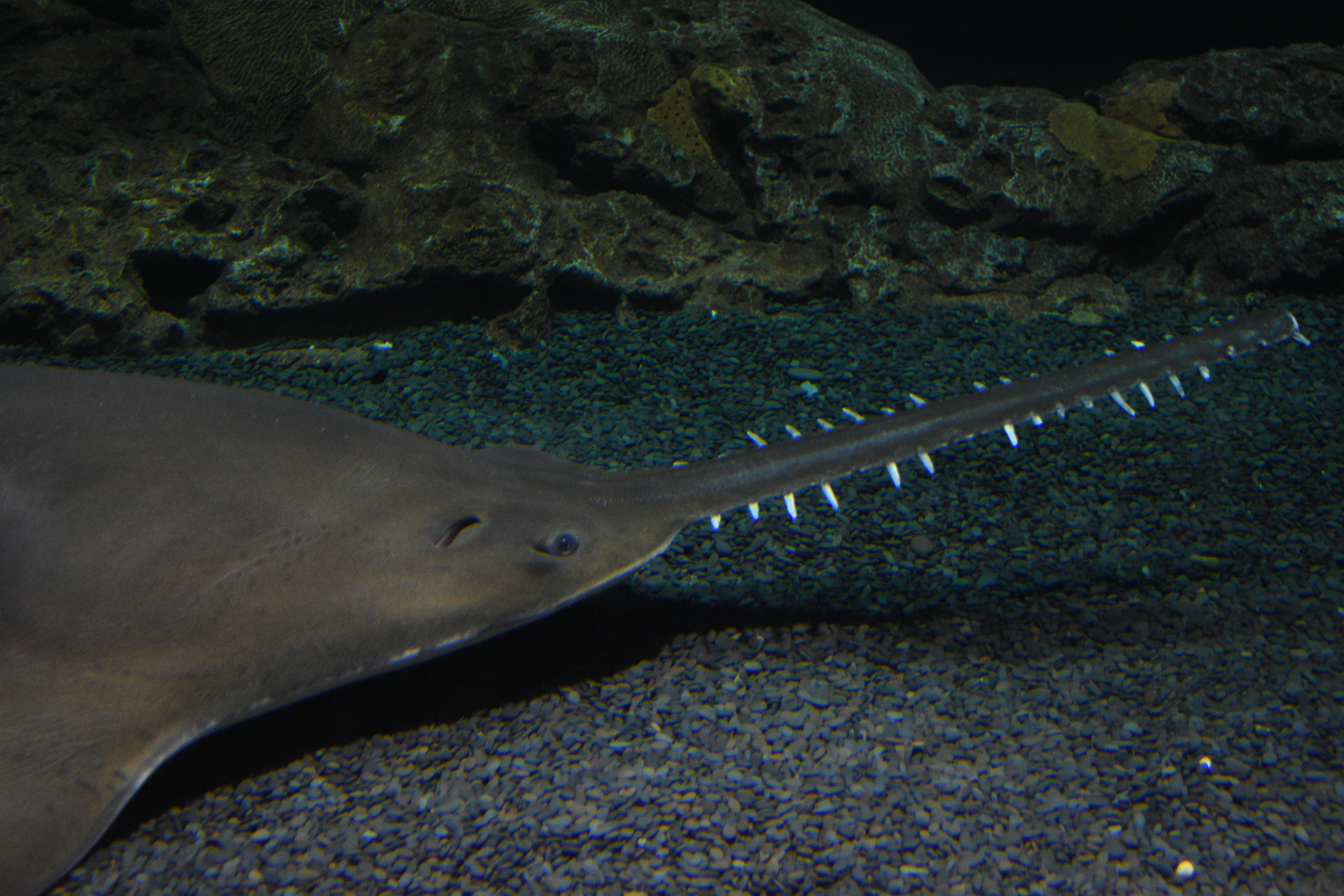
Largetooth Sawfish
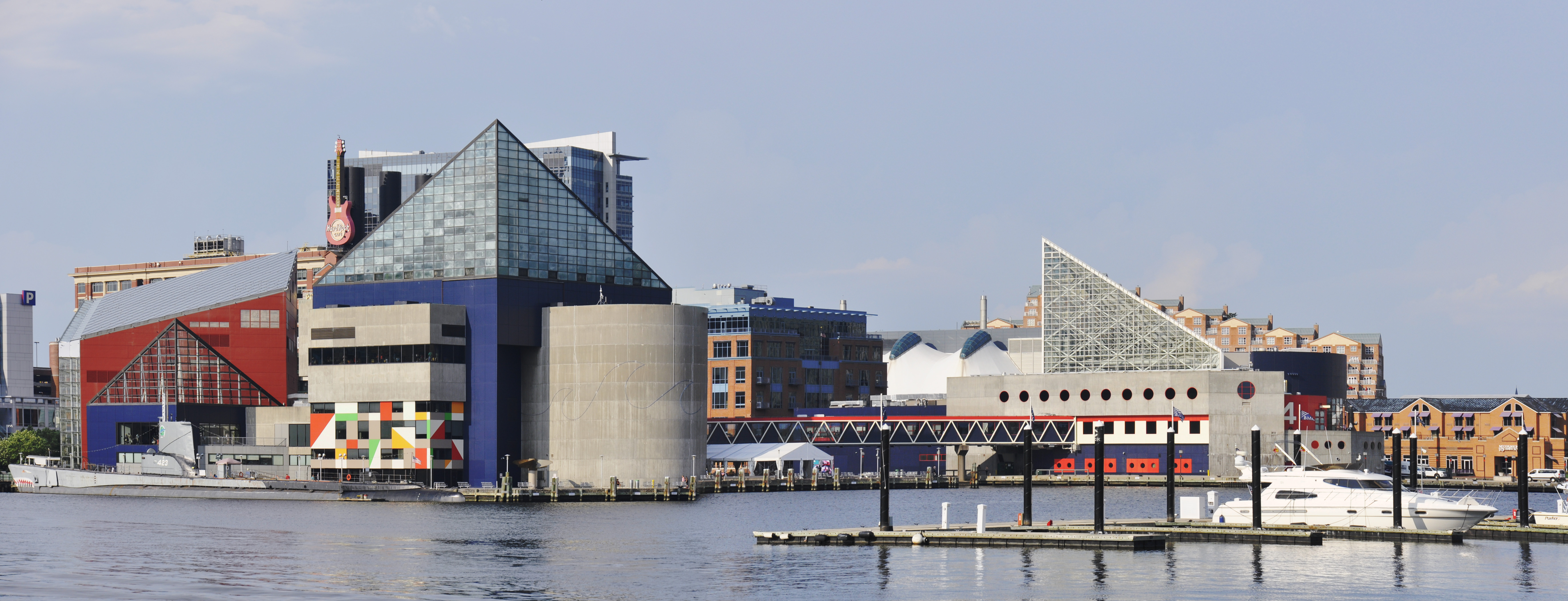
Left to right: The red building with a green glass front (north) wall holds the 2005 extension, the blue building with the glass pyramid top is the main building of poured concrete construction from 1981, and behind it, across a pedestrian bridge to the east is the Pier 4 marine mammal pavilion.
