= Babcock (disambiguation) =

Babcock is a surname.

Babcock may also refer to:

== Places ==
- Babcock (crater), a lunar crater
- Babcock, Georgia
- Babcock, Indiana
- Babcock, Michigan
- Babcock, Wisconsin
- Babcock Lake (disambiguation)
- Babcock Peak, a mountain in Colorado
- Babcock State Park, West Virginia

== Science ==
- Babcock model, a mechanism to describe sunspot patterns
- Babcock test, which determines the fat content of milk

== Corporations ==
- Babcock & Brown, an Australian investment bank
- Babcock & Wilcox, an American company producing energy production and pollution control equipment
- Babcock International, a British engineering and services company
- Babcock Electric Carriage Company, early 20th century US automobile maker
- Deutsche Babcock, a German engineering and manufacturing company
- Babcock Borsig Service, a German engineering and services company
- Deutsche Babcock Middle East, a German engineering and services holding company in UAE
- Debaj - Deutsche Babcock Al Jaber, a German engineering and services joint-venture company in Qatar
- Doosan Babcock, a British energy services company

== Schools ==
- Babcock University, Seventh-Day Adventist university in Nigeria
- Babcock Graduate School of Management, Wake Forest University's business school, located in Winston-Salem, North Carolina

== Other ==
- Babcock (crater), a lunar crater
- Babcock Amendment, U.S. state of Minnesota constitutional amendment
- USS W. F. Babcock (ID-1239), a collier in commission in the United States Navy from 1917 to 1919

== See also ==
- Babcock House (disambiguation)
