= Babcock Lake =

Babcock Lake may refer to:

- Babcock Lake (California)
- Babcock Lake (New York)
- Babcock Lakes (Washington, D.C.)
