= National Aquarium (Washington, D.C.) =

Defunct aquarium in Washington, D.C.

National Aquarium, Washington, D.C.
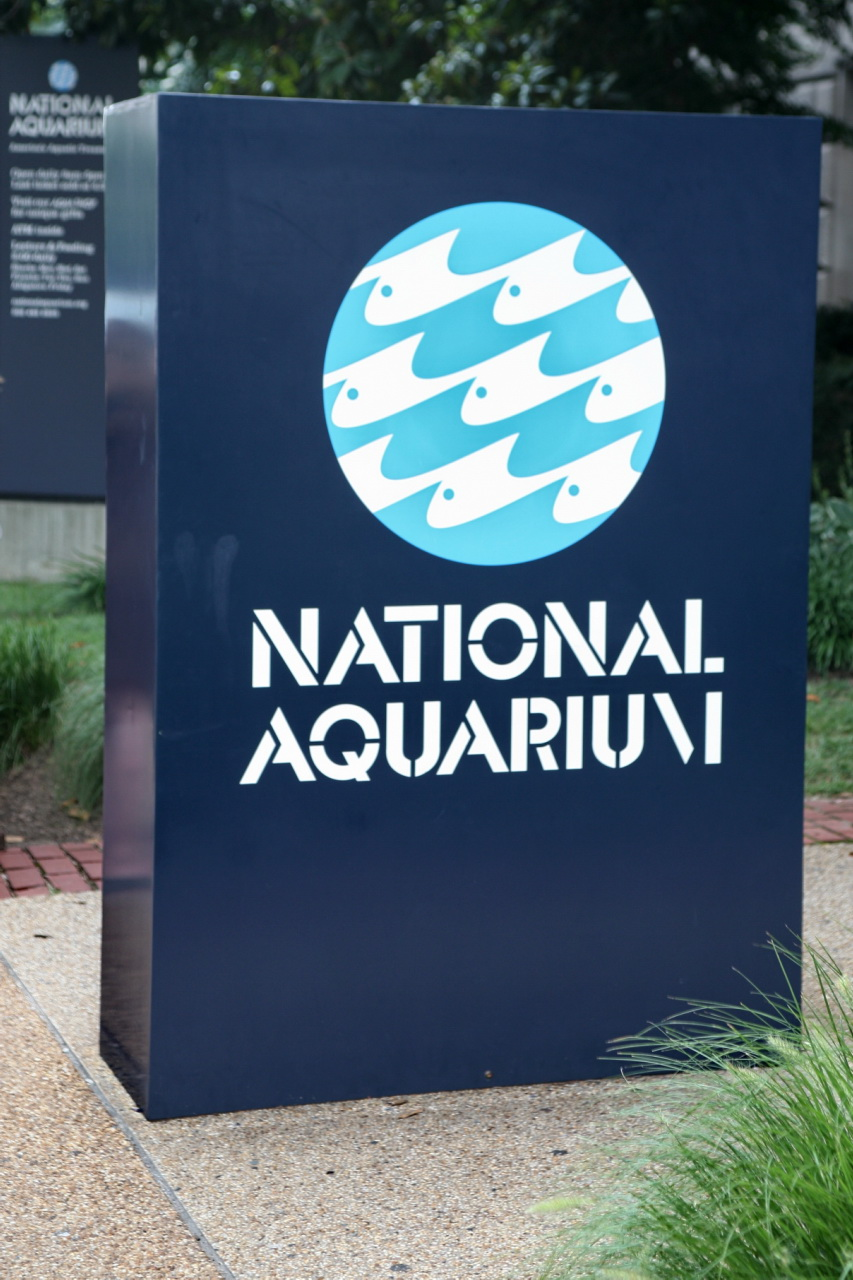
- Entry sign for the National Aquarium in Washington, D.C., which was located on the lower level of the Department of Commerce Building
- Interactive map of National Aquarium, Washington, D.C.
- 38.8936°N 77.0328°W
- Date opened: 1873 (153 years ago)
- Date closed: September 30, 2013 (12 years ago)
- Location: Herbert C. Hoover Building; Washington, D.C., United States
- No. of species: 250
- Memberships: AZA
- Website: www.aqua.org

The National Aquarium, Washington, D.C., was an aquarium in Washington D.C. It was located in the Herbert C. Hoover Building (owned by the General Services Administration), which is bounded by 14th Street NW on the east, 15th Street NW on the west, Pennsylvania Avenue NW on the north, and Constitution Avenue NW on the south. It was the first free and public aquarium in the United States.

The National Aquarium in Washington, D.C. was smaller than its counterpart in Baltimore, Maryland — a facility also known as the National Aquarium, although independent until the two aquariums signed an alliance in 2003. The Washington aquarium closed on September 30, 2013, after 140 years, the longest continuously operating aquarium in the United States at the time.

== History ==
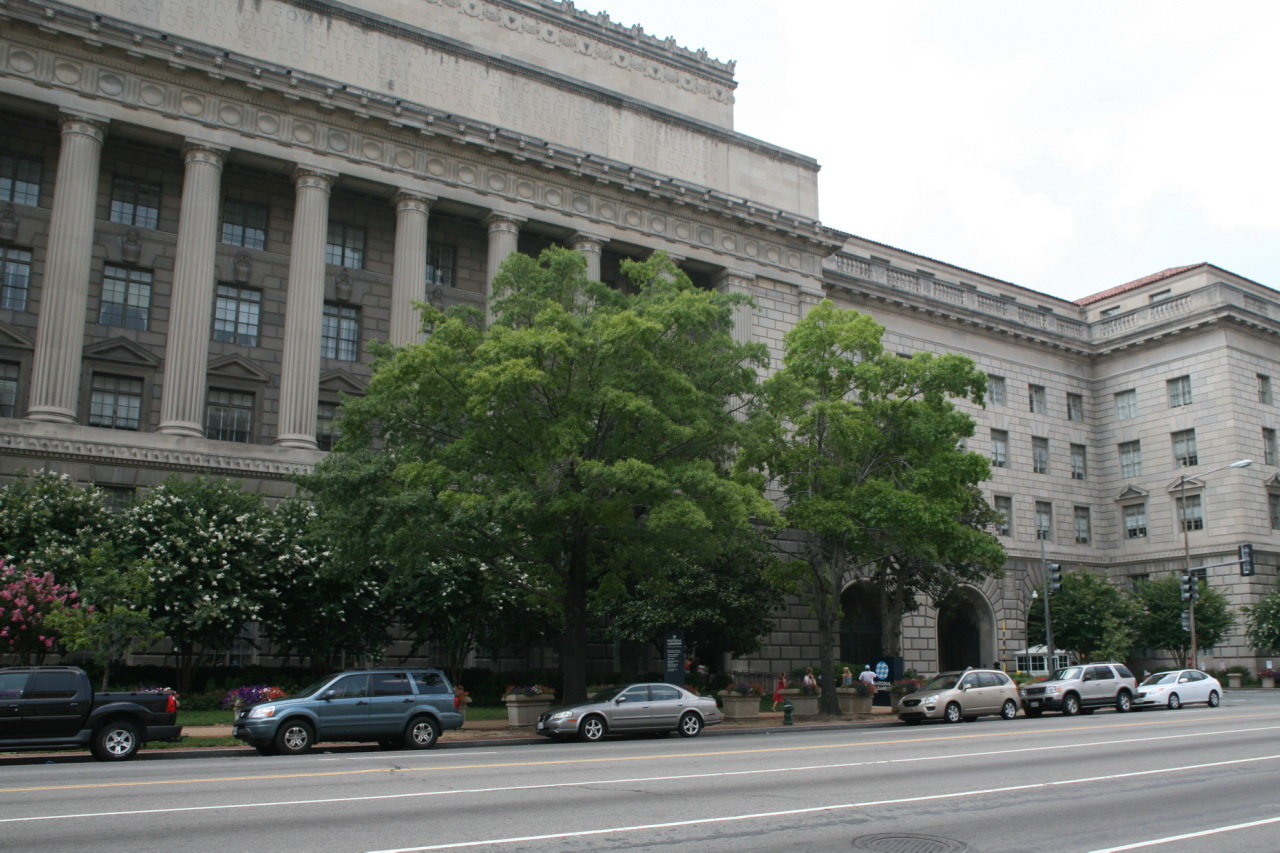
The former location of the aquarium in Washington, D.C.

The National Aquarium was established in 1873 in Woods Hole, Massachusetts under the auspices of the United States Commission of Fish and Fisheries by Commissioner of Fish and Fisheries Spencer Baird. It displayed 180 species of fish, reptiles, and other aquatic animals. In 1878, General Orville E. Babcock, the Superintendent of Public Buildings and Grounds in Washington, D.C. suggested a public aquarium in D.C. As a result, Spencer Baird's Fish Commission was given 20 acres (8.1 ha) of land. Because of this, the National Aquarium moved to the grounds of the Washington Monument in 1878 and consisted of holding ponds known as "Babcock Lakes." During the 1880s, the aquarium moved again into a building called Central Station near the site of today's National Air and Space Museum so that it could better serve its main purpose of being a hatching station for the Fish Commission to breed and raise fish for distribution across the United States.

The Fish Commission was incorporated into the Department of Commerce and Labor in 1903 and renamed the United States Bureau of Fisheries, and Secretary of Commerce and Labor George B. Cortelyou called for "...a national aquarium of such size and architectural excellence that it will be a credit to the nation." The Bureau of Fisheries became a part of the United States Department of Commerce in 1913, and when the Commerce Department building was completed in 1932, the National Aquarium moved to the lower level of the building. The Bureau of Fisheries moved to the United States Department of the Interior in 1939 and merged with the Interior Department's Bureau of Biological Survey (previously the Department of Agriculture's Division of Economic Ornithology and Mammalogy, among other names) in 1940 to form the Fish and Wildlife Service, an agency of the Department of the Interior. Despite falling under the Department of the Interior, the National Aquarium remained in the Department of Commerce building.

In 2003, the National Aquarium Society Board of Directors signed an alliance agreement with the Board of Directors of the National Aquarium in Baltimore, enabling the two aquariums to work together to strengthen the animal collection and educational impact of the aquarium.

== Relationship with the National Aquarium in Baltimore ==
The National Aquarium is a separate aquarium in Baltimore, Maryland. Founded in 1981, it was originally distinct from the Washington aquarium. Both used the title "National Aquarium;" the National Aquarium in Washington, D.C., was older, while the National Aquarium in Baltimore is larger. Like its Washington counterpart, the National Aquarium in Baltimore is not managed or funded by the federal government, despite the official-sounding names. Neither aquarium is or was part of the Smithsonian Institution.

On September 4, 2003, the National Aquarium Society and the Board of Governors for the National Aquarium in Baltimore announced an alliance, in which the National Aquarium in Baltimore would operate the D.C. aquarium. A signing ceremony hosted by Secretary of Commerce Donald Evans was held at the Commerce Department building.

== Collection ==
The National Aquarium, Washington, D.C., had a collection of over 1,500 specimens and 250 species. Animals in exhibits included longsnout seahorse, leopard sharks, longnose gar, bonytail chub, giant Pacific octopus, chambered nautilus, tiger salamander, eastern hellbender, American alligator, loggerhead sea turtle, red lionfish, and snakehead, as well as piranha, eel, and Japanese carp.

=== National Marine Sanctuaries and National Parks Gallery ===
The National Marine Sanctuaries and National Parks Gallery featured the animals and habitats preserved and protected by America's National Marine Sanctuaries Program. This gallery included exhibits for the Florida Everglades, Channel Islands National Marine Sanctuary, Cordell Bank National Marine Sanctuary, Fagatele Bay National Marine Sanctuary, Florida Keys National Marine Sanctuary, Flower Garden Banks National Marine Sanctuary, and Gray's Reef National Marine Sanctuary. Featured animals included:

- American alligator
- Sea anemones
- Chain catshark
- Chambered nautilus
- Giant Pacific octopus
- Guineafowl puffer
- Horn shark
- Leopard shark
- Swell shark
- Longsnout seahorse
- Red lionfish
- Scarlet kingsnake

=== America's Freshwater Ecosystems Gallery ===
The gallery highlighted American rivers including the Rio Grande, the Potomac River, the Colorado River, and the Mississippi River. Featured animals included:

- Common snapping turtle
- Longnose gar
- Northern snakehead
- American eel
- Razorback sucker

=== Amphibians Gallery ===
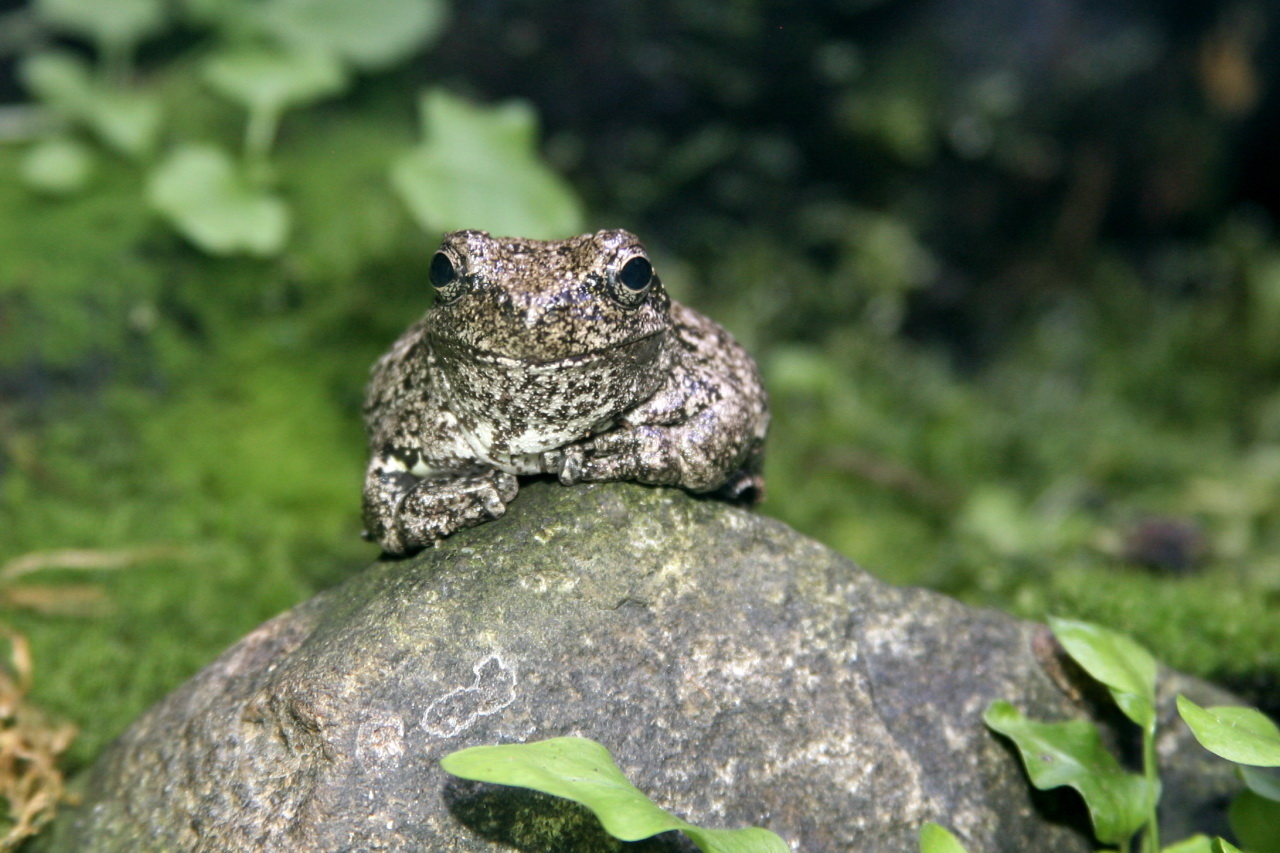
Gray treefrog in an exhibit in the former aquarium.

This gallery showcased salamanders, newts, frogs, and toads to display their adaptations and biology. Featured animals included:

- Eastern newt
- Barking tree frog (Hyla gratiosa)
- Yellow-banded poison dart frog
- Blue-bellied poison frog
- Spotted salamander
- American toad

=== Amazon River Basin Gallery ===
The Amazon River and Amazon basin support some of the most diverse life on the planet. Featured animals included:

- Red-bellied piranha
- Silver arowana
- Blue poison dart frog
- Electric eel
- Emerald tree boa

== Closure ==
External videos
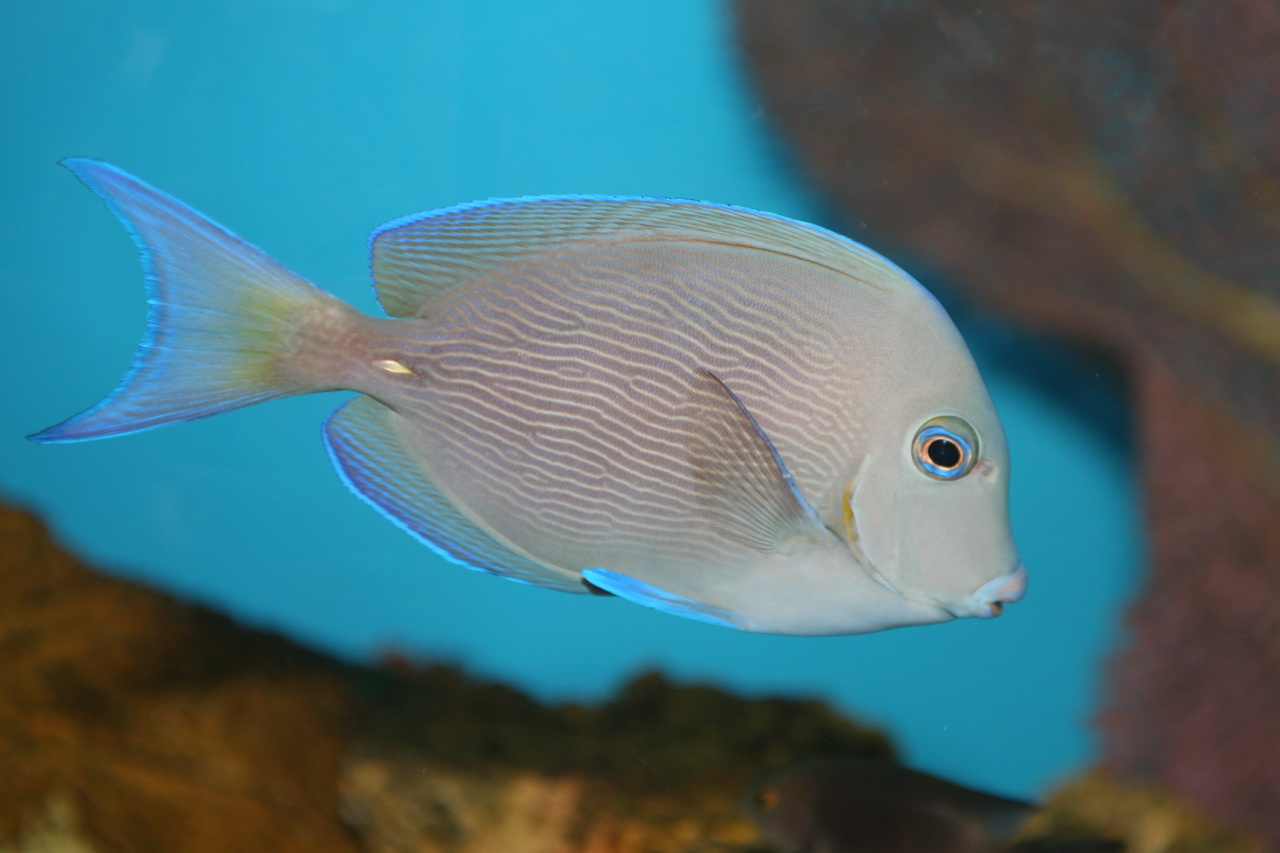
- Closing America's Oldest Public Aquarium, National Geographic

The aquarium closed on September 30, 2013, having permanently lost its location due to a renovation of the Herbert C. Hoover Building. When it closed, it was the longest continuously operating aquarium in the United States. Approximately 1,700 fish and other specimens from its collection were moved to the National Aquarium in Baltimore.

Officials of the aquarium considered ways of re-opening it at another location in Washington, D.C., but they eventually abandoned such plans.
