= Colton's Block =

- U.S. National Register of Historic Places
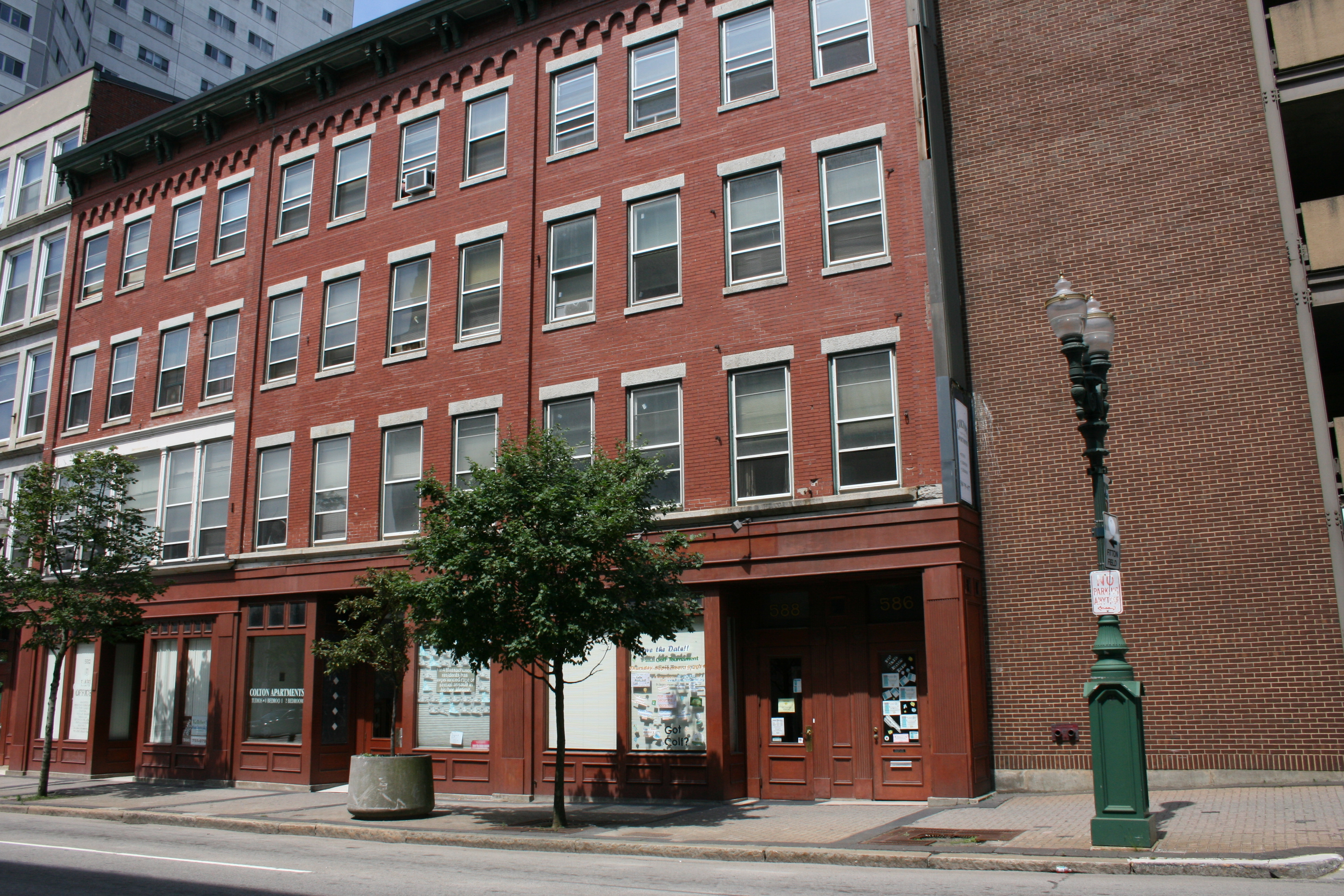

- Location within Massachusetts Location within the United States
- Location: 588 Main St., Worcester, Massachusetts
- Coordinates: 42°15′38″N 71°48′17″W
- Area: less than one acre
- Built: c. 1860
- Architectural style: Italianate
- MPS: Worcester MRA
- NRHP reference No.: 80000610
- Added to NRHP: March 05, 1980

Colton's Block is an historic series of commercial buildings at 586–590 Main Street in Worcester, Massachusetts. Built in the 1860s, it consists of three separate yet similarly-styled buildings separated by firewalls. It is the only surviving example of a commercial building style that was common in Worcester at the time. The building was listed on the National Register of Historic Places in 1980. It is now mostly occupied by residences.

== Description and history ==
Colton's Block is located in downtown Worcester, on the west side of Main Street between the Federal Plaza parking garage and the Babcock Block. It consists of three separate four-story brick buildings with nearly identical styling. Each is four bays wide, with a single storefront on the ground floor; the central entrance now provides access to the upper floors. The three buildings are articulated by slightly projecting piers, which rise to a band of corbelled brickwork and a common projecting cornice studded with paired brackets. The leftmost building has slightly larger windows on the second floor than those elsewhere (an alteration dating to about 1900).

The buildings were likely built in the 1860s by Samuel Colton, who published the Worcester Spy before branching out into other businesses, including real estate development. These types of buildings were once quite common in downtown Worcester, and these are now the only ones left. The earliest documented occupants were dry goods retailers and wholesalers.

== See also ==
- National Register of Historic Places listings in northwestern Worcester, Massachusetts
- National Register of Historic Places listings in Worcester County, Massachusetts
