= Herbert C. Hoover Building =

Building in Washington, D.C.

- U.S. Historic district – Contributing property
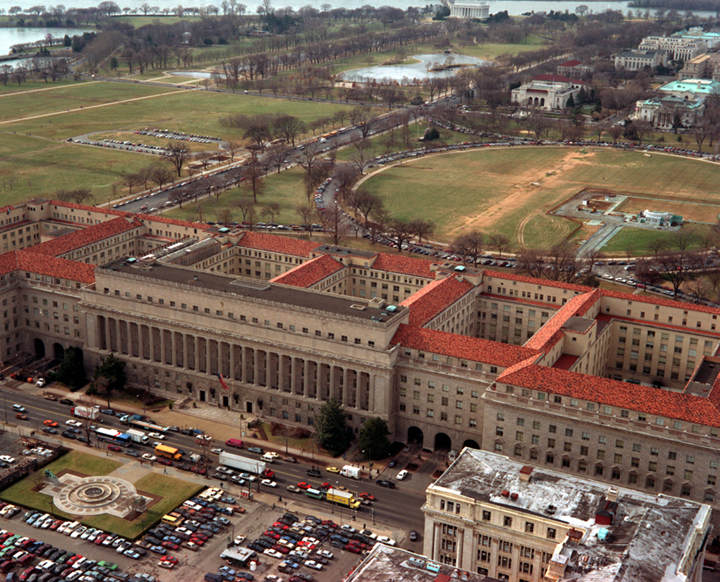
- Aerial view from 14th Street NW, with the Hoover Building in the foreground and its six courtyards visible. In the background is President's Park.

- Location within Washington, D.C.
- Location: 1401 Constitution Avenue NW; Washington, D.C., U.S.
- Coordinates: 38°53′39.48″N 77°1′58.08″W
- Built: 1932; 94 years ago
- Architect: Louis Ayres
- Architectural style: Classical Revival
- Part of: Pennsylvania Avenue National Historic Site (ID66000865)

The Herbert C. Hoover Building is the Washington, D.C. headquarters of the United States Department of Commerce. The building is located at 1401 Constitution Avenue, Northwest, Washington, D.C., on the block bounded by Constitution Avenue NW to the south, Pennsylvania Avenue NW to the north, 15th Street NW to the west, and 14th Street NW to the east. It is located in the Federal Triangle, east of President's Park South (the Ellipse), north of the National Mall, and west of other Department of Commerce buildings, the John A. Wilson Building (District Building with the government of the District of Columbia / Washington, D.C.), and the Ronald Reagan Building. The building is owned by the General Services Administration.

Completed in 1932, it was renamed after Herbert Hoover in 1981. Hoover served as Secretary of Commerce (1921–1928) and later President (1929–1933). The closest Washington Metro station is Federal Triangle. The White House Visitor Center (on the first floor) is in the Hoover Building.

== History ==
=== Construction ===
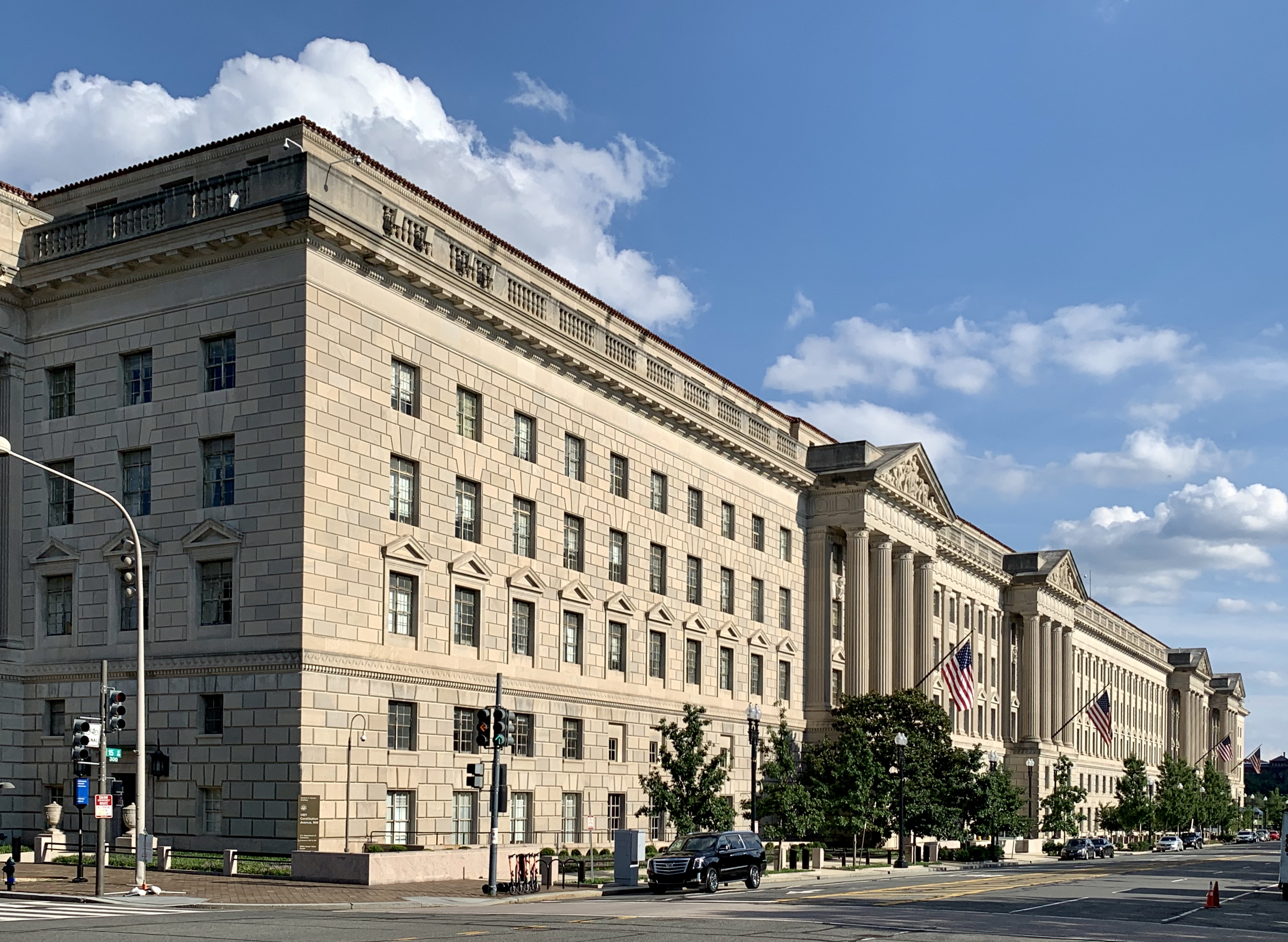
The Herbert C. Hoover Building, viewed from 15th Street NW

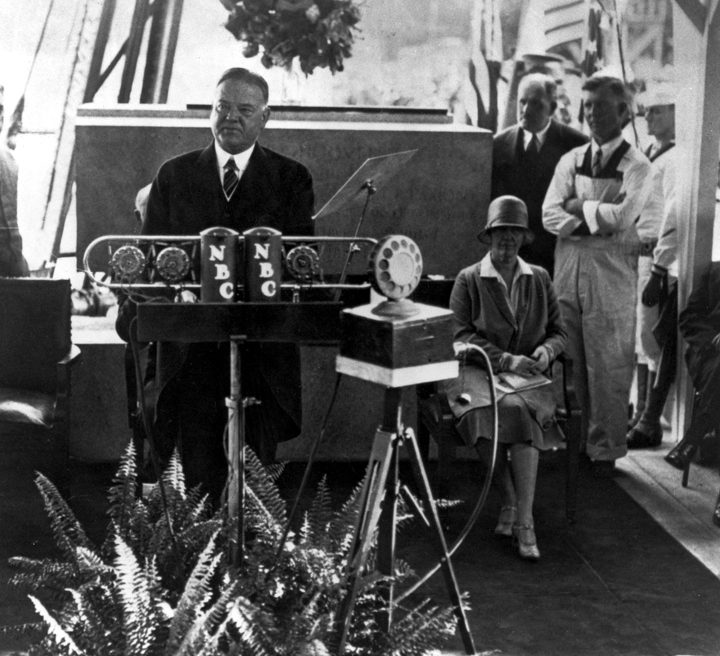
Herbert Hoover addresses guests and a radio audience at the cornerstone ceremony, July 10, 1929

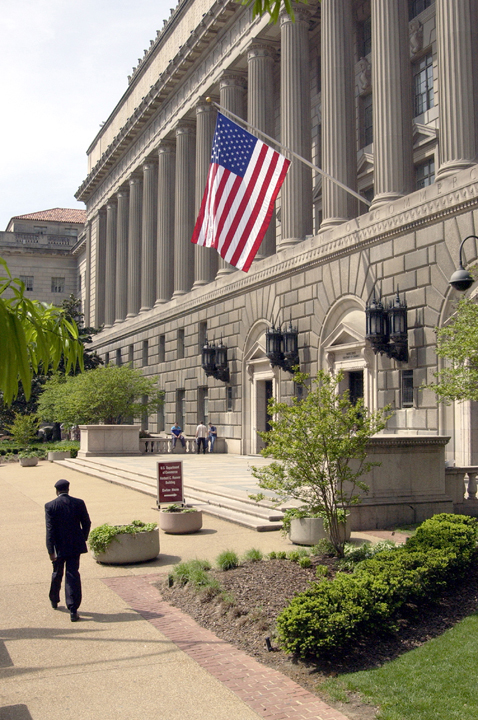
The Herbert C. Hoover Building main entrance, 14th Street NW and Constitution Avenue NW

The Department of Commerce was established after President William Howard Taft signed legislation creating the department on his last day in office, March 4, 1913, splitting the former Department of Commerce and Labor into the Department of Commerce and the Department of Labor.

In 1928, Congress authorized the purchase of land in what is now known as the Federal Triangle for departmental offices. The authorization was part of a wave of government construction; the 1926 Public Buildings Act permitted the government to hire private architects for the design of federal buildings, which led to large-scale construction of public buildings, including the development of the 70-acre (280,000 m^{2}) Federal Triangle site between the Capitol and the White House.

Soon afterward Treasury Secretary Andrew W. Mellon and the Board of Architectural Consultants, composed of leading architects and headed by Edward H. Bennett of the Chicago architectural firm of Bennett, Parsons, and Frost, developed design guidelines for the site. Under Bennett's direction, each member of the board designed one of the buildings in the Federal Triangle complex to "provide each government agency or bureau with a building that would address its functional needs, while combining the individual buildings into a harmonious, monumental overall design expressive of the dignity and authority of the federal government."

Louis Ayres, a member of the board, was selected as the architect for the Department of Commerce Building. Ayres, Arthur Brown Jr. (assigned to the Interstate Commerce Commission building, now one of the Environmental Protection Agency buildings) and William Adams Delano (assigned to the United States Post Office Department Building, now the William J. Clinton Federal Building) were charged with forming the west end of the Triangle and creating an open green mall.

Construction began on October 4, 1927, when Herbert Hoover was the Secretary of Commerce, and the cornerstone was laid on July 10, 1929, early in Hoover's presidential term.

At the time of the building's completion in 1932 it was the largest office building in the world with over 1.8 million square feet (170,000 m^{2}) of floor area and 6 acres (24,000 m^{2}) of Ludowici tile roofing.

=== Renaming ===
The building was renamed after Hoover in December 1981 by act of Congress. U.S. Representative Arlan Stangeland of Minnesota co-sponsored the bill and asked the House of Representatives to "pay tribute to this great Commerce Secretary", making no mention of Hoover's presidency, which was marked by the beginning of the Great Depression. Democratic Representative John G. Fary of Illinois, chairman of the House Subcommittee on Public Buildings and Grounds brought the bill up for consideration as a favor to Republicans.

An aide was quoted as saying, "He was a little concerned what some people might think of him bringing up a bill to honor Herbert Hoover in the midst of a Republican recession." The building was officially dedicated as the Herbert C. Hoover Building on April 25, 1983, coinciding with the release of the first volume of George H. Nash's biography The Life of Herbert Hoover: The Engineer.

Only limited upgrades were made to the Herbert Hoover Building after 1932. By 2007, all other buildings in Federal Triangle had been renovated except the Herbert Hoover Building.

In 2007, the General Services Administration announced an eight-phase, 13-year, $960 million modernization and renovation of the Herbert Hoover Building. In part, the renovation will provide the building with a modern technology infrastructure, modern offices and energy-saving fixtures, and improved security. The National Capital Planning Commission (NCPC) approved the renovation project in 2007. The phases, each of which is to last 18 months, include:

- Phase 1 — Construction of "swing space" to house staff while renovations occur; replacement of the HVAC system cooling towers on the roof.
- Phase 2 — Renovation of the interior Corridor 1 (which runs parallel to Constitution Avenue NW); restoration of the entire exterior facade; and replacement of major utilities serving the building.
- Phase 3 — Renovation of the interior and replacement of the roof on Corridor 2 (the second corridor north of Constitution Avenue NW).
- Phase 4 — Renovation of the interior and replacement of the roof on Corridor 3 (the third corridor north of Constitution Avenue NW).
- Phase 5 — Renovation of the interior and replacement of the roof on Corridor 4 (the fourth corridor north of Constitution Avenue NW).
- Phase 6 — Renovation of the interior and replacement of the roof on Corridor 5 (the fifth corridor north of Constitution Avenue NW).
- Phase 7 — Renovation of the interior and replacement of the roof on Corridor 6 (the sixth corridor north of Constitution Avenue NW).
- Phase 8 — Renovation of the interior and replacement of the roof on Corridor 2 (the corridor parallel to Pennsylvania Avenue NW).

GSA's Federal Building Fund will contribute $605 million toward the renovation, while the Department of Commerce's contribution is $128 million. Another $225.6 million, provided by the American Recovery and Reinvestment Act of 2009, funded Phases 2 and 3. Both GSA and the Department of Commerce contributions are dependent upon annual congressional appropriations. The Great Recession provided GSA with $40 million in savings.

The project also proposed creating a new Constitution Avenue entrance for the National Aquarium. The NCPC approved this redesign in 2010.

By late 2012, however, budget cuts led to an indefinite delay in completing the project. Nonetheless, GSA pressed ahead with plans in February 2012 to create a more secure barrier around the Herbert Hoover Building. GSA proposed a steel cable barrier concealed by stone cladding, deep-buried steel piers, and collapsing sidewalks. Beautification elements included two reflecting pools along 14th Street NW, which would include public seating and Capital Bikeshare stations.

== Design and art ==
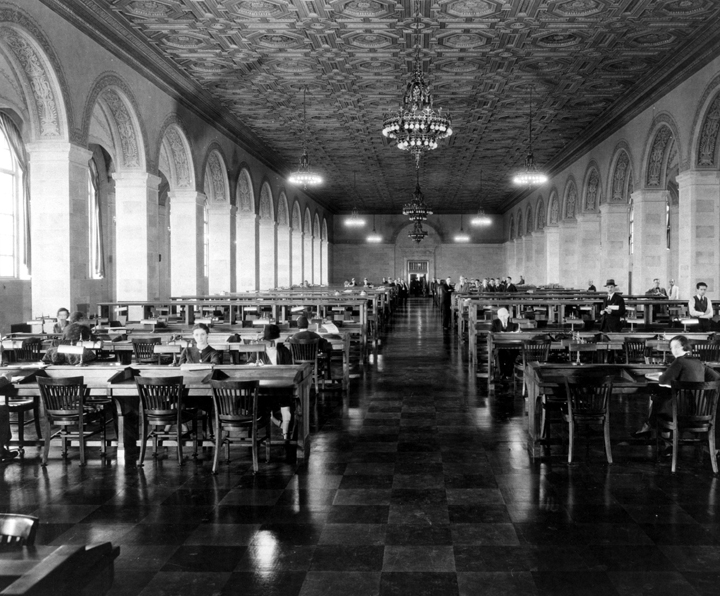
Malcolm Baldrige Great Hall, named for former Commerce Secretary Howard M. Baldrige Jr.

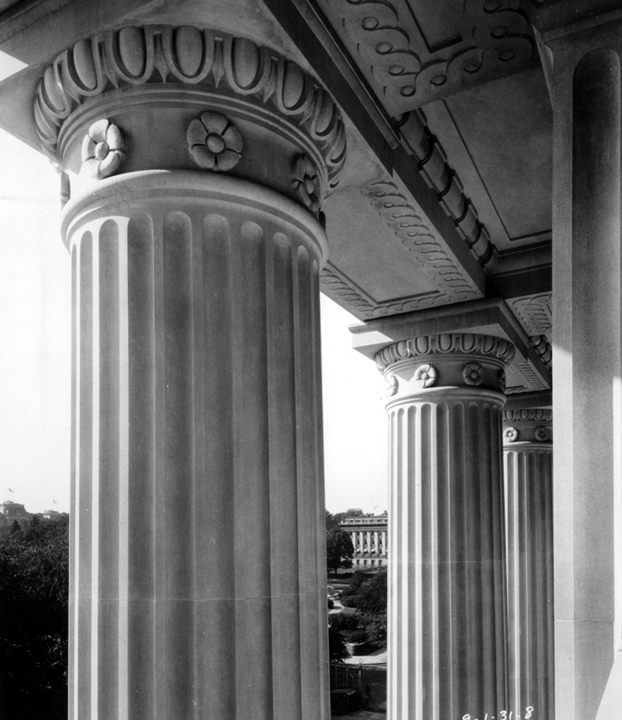
Doric columns

The building is rectangular and measures approximately 320 feet (98 m) east to west and 1,020 feet (310 m) north to south. It forms almost the entire west side of the Federal Triangle from Constitution Avenue to E Street. The building contains more than 3,300 rooms joined by unbroken corridors 1,000 feet (300 m) long. Flexible partitions rather than permanent walls were a part of the original design for many of the offices to allow for changes in departmental organization.

The New York Times has described it as "sprawling." The magnificent front of the building is its eastern facade. This east-facing facade is on Fourteenth Street, and contains sixty-three bays, or vertical spaces between columns divided into five portions with projecting sections at the ends and the center. The large, oversized bronze doors were manufactured by the General Bronze Corporation.

"The center section contains a dramatic Doric colonnade of twenty-four fluted columns, each forty-two feet tall, comprising the third through fifth floors. This section also contains the major pedestrian entrances, and its roofline is crowned with a repeating series of alternating carved eagles and torches. Elaborately treated bronze doors are set into each portal. Similar portals are used for the three central pedestrian doors, inset with elaborate rectangular granite openings and triangular pediments atop carved corbels. Clusters of three large, bronze, octagonal lamps, each with an acanthus base, rope molding, and spiraletes flank these doors."

— GSA, Herbert Hoover Building

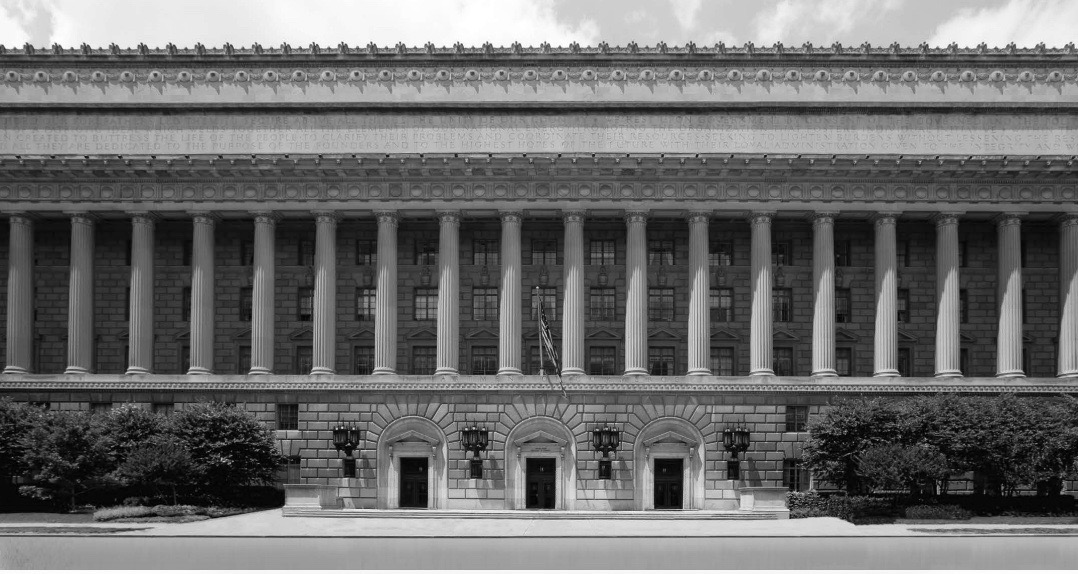
The 14th St east entrance's three large bronze doors

The Malcolm Baldrige Great Hall is located on the first floor of the north end of the building, facing Pennsylvania Avenue, houses the White House Visitor Center, operated by the National Park Service. The Great Hall is 225 feet (69 m) long and 62 feet (19 m) wide and was originally used as the Patent Search Room for more than three million patents cataloged by the Department of Commerce (the United States Patent and Trademark Office is part of the Commerce Department). As part of the United States Bicentennial celebrations, the Great Hall became the Bicentennial Visitor Center in 1976 and until 1989 housed the Washington Tourist Information Center. Renovations began in July 1993 with the restoration of the ornate plaster ceiling to restore the simple elegance of the Great Hall. The original Indiana limestone walls, bronze doors, Vermont marble base and accent flooring, and Italianate bronze chandeliers were cleaned and refurbished. In March 1995 the White House Visitor Center was opened. Aspects of other buildings built in Federal Triangle in the 1930s are present in the building, including courtyards – natural light and ventilation are provided to inner offices by six interior courtyards – and a Neoclassical (Greek Revival) architectural style (a Doric colonnade on three sides).

The 15th Street western facade stretches almost three city blocks and has four pedimented pavilions featuring limestone pediment sculpture by James Earle Fraser, Haig Patigian, Joseph Kiselewski, and Ulysses Ricci. John Donnelley Company was the stone carver on all the pediments. The National Aquarium was located in the basement and was open to the public since the building was completed in 1932 until 2013.

Also located inside the building is the Commerce Research Library, a Federal Agency Library which is open to the public but is used mainly by Commerce and other federal government employees and academics. The National Institute of Standards and Technology (NIST), National Oceanic and Atmospheric Administration (NOAA), and Census Bureau, all part of the Department of Commerce, maintain their own library collections. Because the Census Bureau is a part of the Commerce Department, the official Population Clock at one point was located in the lobby of the Hoover Building. It briefly malfunctioned in 1982 when it showed some 50 million more Americans than estimated. The clock now resides at the Census Bureau's headquarters in Suitland, Maryland.

== National Aquarium ==
The National Aquarium was housed in the Herbert C. Hoover Building since its construction in 1932. It was the first free and public aquarium in the U.S.

The aquarium closed after budget sequestration on September 30, 2013, having permanently lost its location due to the renovation of the Hoover Building. This was the first time that the aquarium closed in the 140 years since its opening in 1873.

== See also ==
- Contributing property
- General Services Administration
- Old Post Office Pavilion
- National Aquarium in Washington, D.C.
- J. Edgar Hoover Building (F.B.I. Headquarters)
