= Dr. Raymond Babcock House =

- U.S. National Register of Historic Places
- Location within California
- Location: 96 S. Humboldt St., Willits, California
- Coordinates: 39°24′41.5″N 123°21′12.5″W
- Area: less than one acre
- Built by: Roy Whited
- Architectural style: Late 19th and 20th Century Revivals
- NRHP reference No.: 04000620
- Added to NRHP: August 19, 2004

The Dr. Raymond Babcock House, at 96 S. Humboldt St. in Willits, California, in Mendocino County, California, was listed on the National Register of Historic Places in 2004. The listing included three contributing buildings, a contributing structure, and a contributing object.

It is a two-story, wood-frame house which was built by Roy Whited, who designed and built many houses in Willits. It is vernacular Classical Revival in style. It has an L-shaped veranda, partly recessed, around Humboldt Street and Mendocino Street sides. It has gables in both directions, with boxed cornices.

It originally was a one-story house with Queen Anne elements. In 1919, Dr. Babcock built a one-room hospital behind the house. The upper story was added in the 1930s.

The property includes a collection of bells, collected by Dr. Babcock during the 1930s through 1960s. A redwood frame called the Babcock Bell Tower, designed and built by Dr. and Mrs. Babcock in 1945, supports an assortment of town, school, locomotive, ship and team bells, almost all from Mendocino County. It also includes the Santa Rosa town bell from Sonoma County.
