= Babcock Lakes =

Former body of water in the District of Columbia, United States

The Babcock Lakes (38.8901119°N 77.0385880°W) were a series of water ponds formerly located near the Washington Monument in Washington, D.C., before the area became the National Mall. In 1878, they were designated as fisheries by the United States Fish Commission, in an effort to increase availability of commercial fish in America. While extant, the lakes played a key role in introducing Eurasian carp into the United States. By 1896, some 2.4 million carp had been distributed from the lakes to restock fish supplies in both North and South America.

The ponds referred to as the Babcock Lakes were located on what was originally an island of Tiber Creek, Ripp's Island, which became surrounded by the main Babcock Lake. Babcock Lake itself was created from a remnant of the Washington City Canal. A small bridge was constructed to connect to Ripp's Island. Seven of the eight ponds were used for carp breeding, while one was exclusively for use of turtles. The ponds were planted with aquatic vegetation and a small aquarium onsite allowed for public viewing of representative fish. The first carp arrived in Baltimore in 1877 from Germany, with leather, mirror and common varieties included. (Note: The original stocking site was in Druid Hill Park, and a group, including leather carp, scaled carp, golden ides and King or Hungarian tench, was subsequently transferred to Washington, D.C. in 1878.) Other fish species that were introduced to the ponds included tench, golden ide, bass and crappie. Goldfish were made available to the public by the Fish Commission until around 1894.

German scientist Rudolph Hessel was an early superintendent of the ponds.

In 1887 the original Babcock Lakes were closed by order of the U.S. Senate due to concern about land subsidence around the newly completed Washington Monument. Four new lakes were constructed closer to the Potomac River to replace them in 1888, but the site was prone to flooding by the river. The Ripp's Island aquarium facilities were transferred to the U.S. Department of Commerce and were later incorporated into the National Aquarium.

By 1896, Eurasian carp had fallen out of favor for stocking due to their invasive characteristics. In 1901 the ponds were repurposed for bass and crappie production, and by 1907 the Evening Star reported that the ponds had fallen into neglect.

By 1911, the lakes had been covered by land dredged from the Potomac River in the expansion of West Potomac Park.

The lakes were named after Army engineer Orville E. Babcock, who designed the original ponds.
