= Babcock Block =

- U.S. National Register of Historic Places
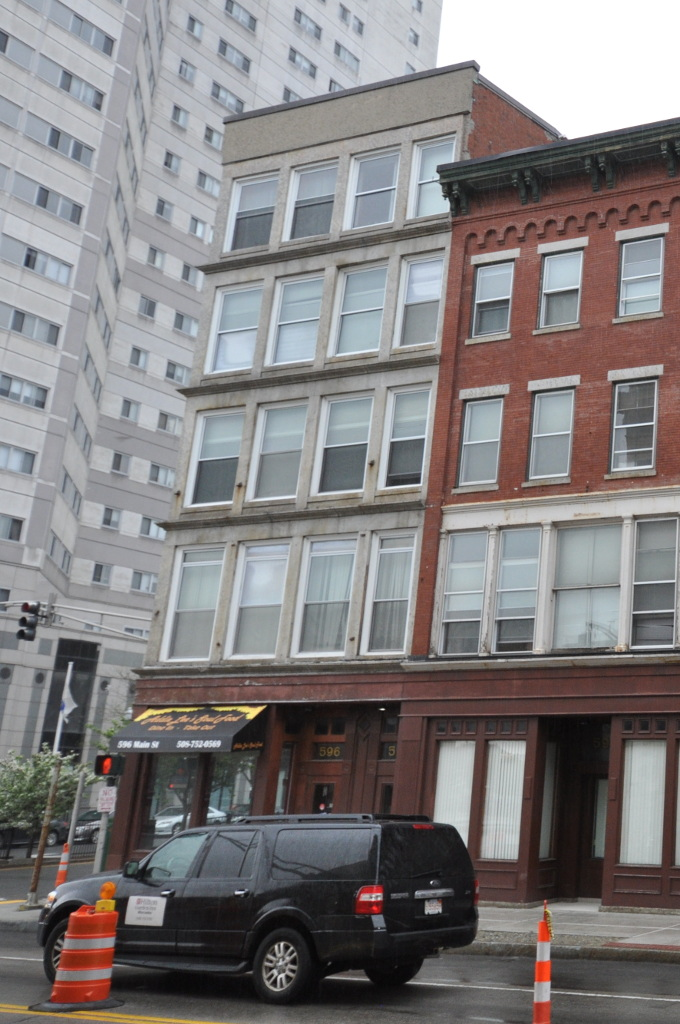
- 2019 photo

- Location within Massachusetts Location within the United States
- Location: 596 Main St., Worcester, Massachusetts
- Coordinates: 42°15′37″N 71°48′18″W
- Area: less than one acre
- Built: 1860
- MPS: Worcester MRA
- NRHP reference No.: 80000611
- Added to NRHP: March 05, 1980

The Babcock Block is a historic commercial building at 596 Main Street in Worcester, Massachusetts. Built in the 1860s, it is a rare example of granite construction in the period. It was listed on the National Register of Historic Places in 1980.

== Description and history ==
The Babcock Block is located on the south side of Worcester's central business district, at the northwest corner of Main and Austin Streets. It is a five-story masonry structure, built with load-bearing brick and stone. The Main Street facade has a single storefront on the ground floor, with display windows flanking a recessed entrance, and the main building entrance to its right, also recessed. The upper floors are separated from each other by projecting cornices, and are four bays wide, with each bay occupied by large sash windows. The facade is composed of granite blocks that are structural (i.e. not just a facing in front of brick or other material), while the Austin Street facade is secondary in nature, composed of pressed brick studded with star-shaped metal tie rod plates. Most windows on this facade are set in segmented-arch openings; those nearest Main Street are shallower, and are set in rounded-arch openings.

Chester Babcock, its first recorded owner, was a mover of buildings. It was built in the 1860s, probably about the same time as Colton's Block, just to its north. The granite facade is unique among surviving period buildings in Worcester's commercial districts.

== See also ==
- National Register of Historic Places listings in northwestern Worcester, Massachusetts
- National Register of Historic Places listings in Worcester County, Massachusetts
