= Babcock-Shattuck House =

Historic house in New York, United States

- U.S. National Register of Historic Places
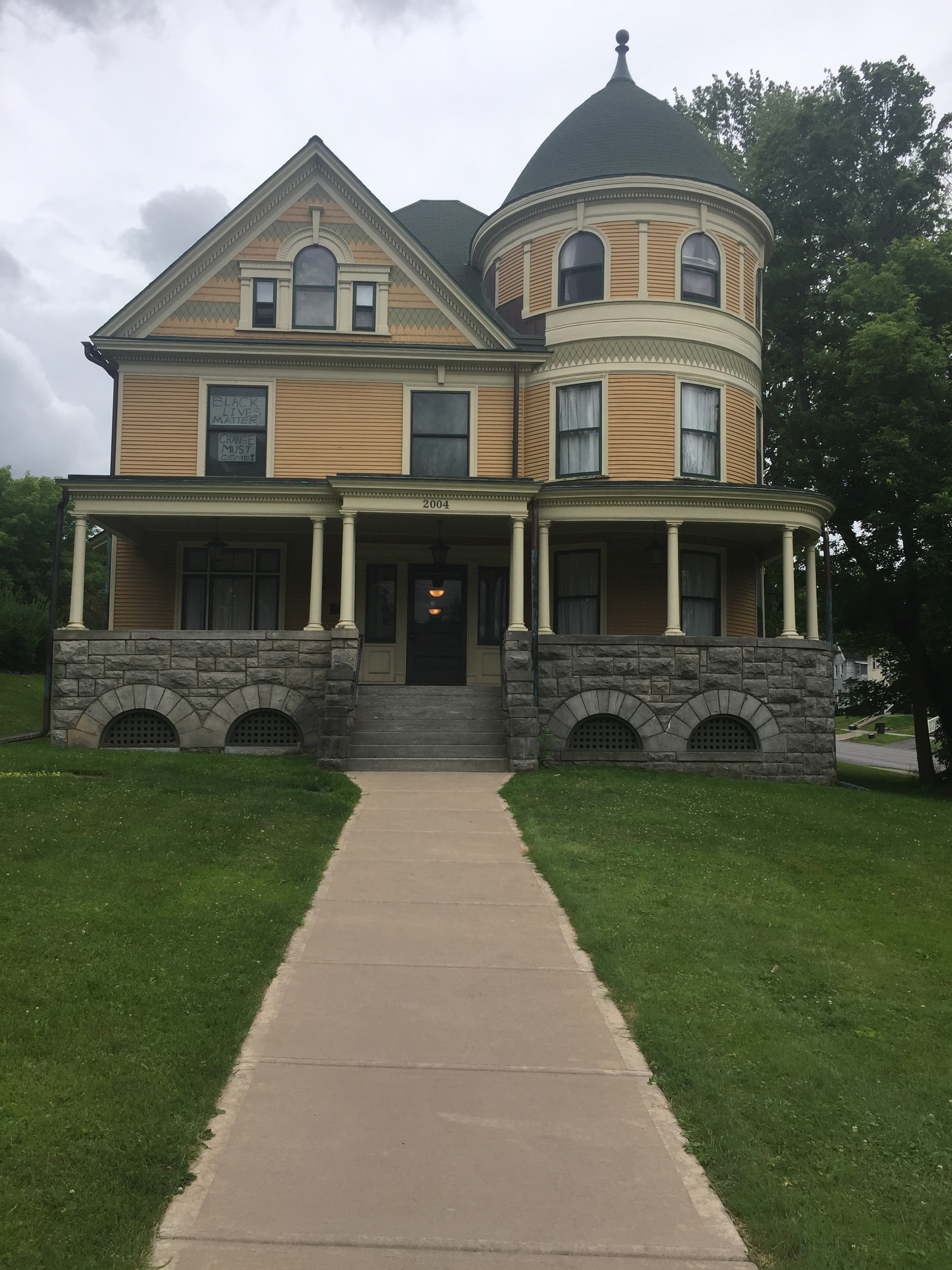
- House in 2021

- Location within New York Location within the United States
- Interactive map showing the location of Babcock-Shattuck House
- Location: 22004 E. Genesee St., Syracuse, New York
- Coordinates: 43°2′42.6″N 76°7′09.6″W
- Built: 1895
- Architectural style: Queen Anne
- NRHP reference No.: 04000429
- Added to NRHP: May 12, 2004

The Babcock-Shattuck House (also known as the Jewish War Veterans Post) is a prominent house at the corner of East Genesee and Westcott Streets in Syracuse, New York.

== Description and history ==
The Queen Anne-style house was built in the mid-1890s to be the home of Dr. Archer D. Babcock, a founding member of the Crouse-Irving Hospital. It was Babcock's home until 1913.

Beginning during World War II, it was a post of the Jewish War Veterans of the United States of America. They converted the second floor into a large meeting room. During the tenure of this organization, the house played an important role in the Jewish community of Syracuse.

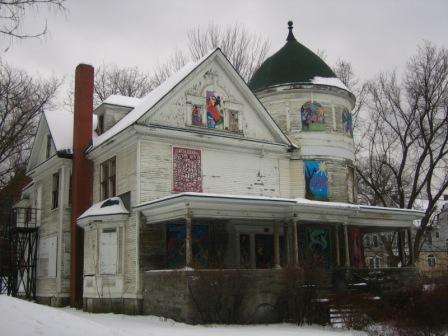
House, vacant, in 2008

It was listed on the National Register of Historic Places on May 12, 2004.

The house was restored by the University Neighborhood Preservation Association and was divided into 4 condominium units, 3 owned by the association and 1 by a private owner. An open house was held in 2015.
