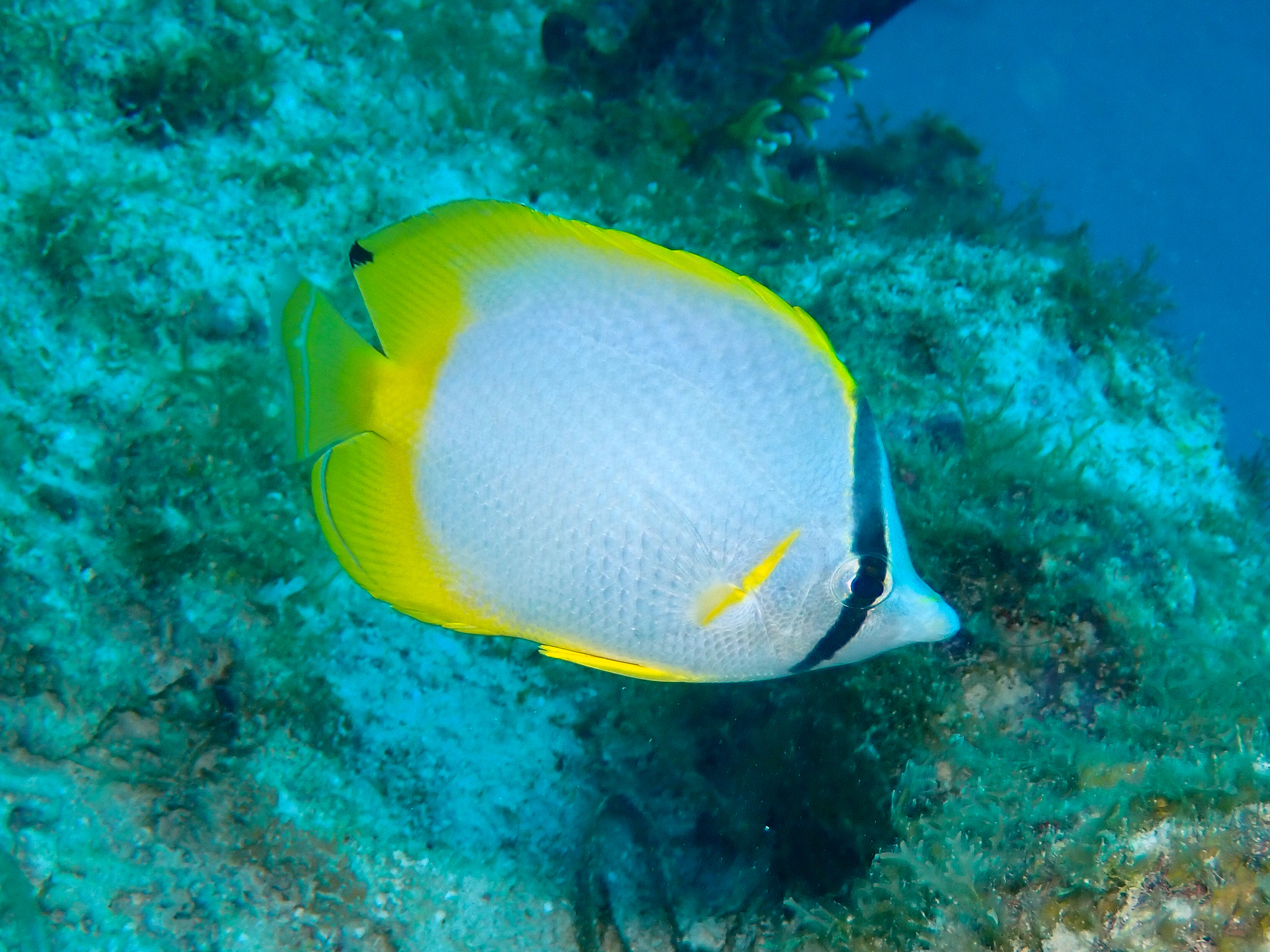

Conservation status
- Least Concern (IUCN 3.1)

Scientific classification
- Kingdom: Animalia
- Phylum: Chordata
- Class: Actinopterygii
- Order: Acanthuriformes
- Family: Chaetodontidae
- Genus: Chaetodon
- Subgenus: Chaetodon (Chaetodon)
- Species: C. ocellatus

Binomial name
- Chaetodon ocellatus Bloch, 1787

Synonyms
- Chaetodon bimaculatus Bloch, 1790; Sarothrodus maculocinctus Gill, 1861; Sarothrodus ataeniatus Poey, 1868; Sarothrodus amplecticollis Poey, 1868

= Spotfin butterflyfish =

Species of fish

The spotfin butterflyfish (Chaetodon ocellatus) is species of marine ray-finned fish, a butterflyfish from the family Chaetodontidae. It is found in the western Atlantic Ocean, in the Gulf of Mexico and most commonly found in the Caribbean Sea.

The name is derived from the dark spot on the fish's dorsal fin. This, combined with a vertical, black bar through the eye, is an adaptation that can confuse predators. The vertical black bar disappears as the fish gets older and other black lines become more prominent. Along with other Caribbean Seas reef dwelling tropical fish, many young spotfin butterfly fish get sucked up the gulf stream from July to late October and are dumped into Long Island bays. The spotfin butterfly fish is very common and very hard to maintain in a tank. The spotfin butterfly fish can grow up to 6–8 inches.
