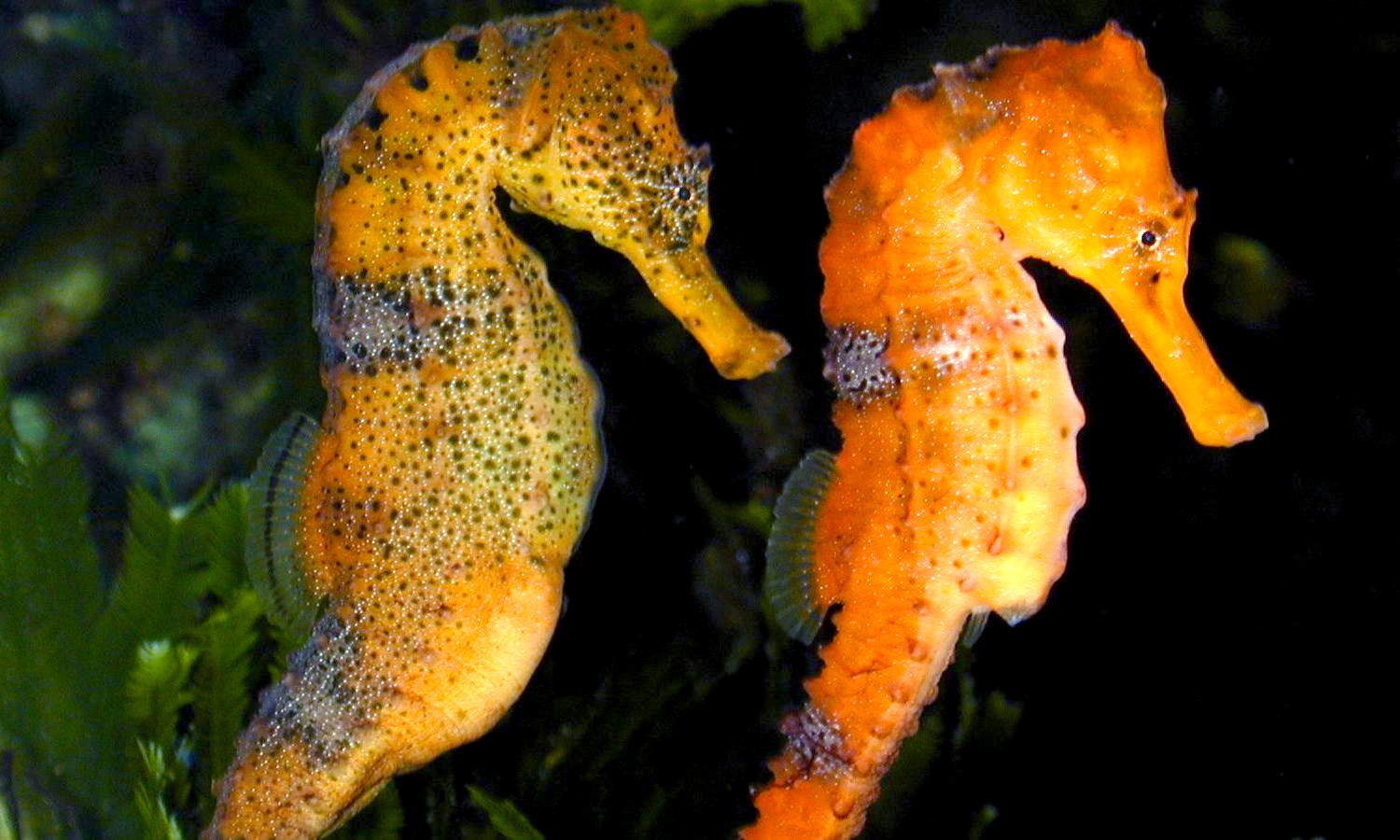
- Male and female Hippocampus reidi

Conservation status
- Near Threatened (IUCN 3.1)
- CITES Appendix II

Scientific classification
- Kingdom: Animalia
- Phylum: Chordata
- Class: Actinopterygii
- Order: Syngnathiformes
- Family: Syngnathidae
- Genus: Hippocampus
- Species: H. reidi

Binomial name
- Hippocampus reidi Ginsburg, 1933

= Slender seahorse =

Species of fish

The slender seahorse or longsnout seahorse (Hippocampus reidi) is a species of fish in the family Syngnathidae that usually inhabits subtropical regions.

== Etymology ==
The specific name honors Earl D. Reid of the Division of Fishes at the Smithsonian Institution.

== Description ==
The slender seahorses have a gestation period of around two weeks and typically grow to be approximately 6.8 inches long (17.5 centimeters), while the mean height of juvenile slender seahorses is only around 8.2 millimeters. Males are usually orange, while the females are yellow. However, both males and females may have brown or white spots placed sporadically upon their body. These spots may also change into a pink or white color during the courtship period.

== Habitat and distribution ==
The slender seahorse has been found at depths of 55 meters (180 feet). Smaller individuals inhabit shallower waters. The slender seahorse has an affinity for coral reefs and seagrass beds and can be found on gorgonian coral, seagrass, mangroves, and Sargassum. It is native to many countries, including the Bahamas, Barbados, Belize, Bermuda, Brazil, Colombia, Cuba, Grenada, Haiti, Honduras, Jamaica, Panama, United States (Florida and North Carolina), and Venezuela. It inhabits subtropical regions, ranging from 29 degrees north to 25 degrees south and 133 degrees west to 40 degrees east. The species is common in China and more so in Brazil, but in both areas is at risk of becoming an endangered species. In China these seahorses are used for trade and for traditionally Chinese medication, while in Brazil they are heavily traded, involving the commercial extraction of 25 million seahorses per year.
