= Babcock Lake (California) =

- Location within California Location within the United States
- Location: Yosemite National Park, Mariposa County, California
- Coordinates: 37°45′26″N 119°23′47″W
- Type: Lake
- Etymology: John P. Babcock
- Surface area: 3.08 ha (7.6 acres)
- Surface elevation: 8,904 feet (2,714 m)

Babcock Lake is a lake in Yosemite National Park of California.

Babcock Lake was named for John P. Babcock, a state wildlife official. It is located at one end of a spur trail which connects the lake to the popular trail between Vogelsang and Merced Lake High Sierra Camps.

== See also ==
- List of lakes in California
