= Arosio, Switzerland =

Swiss village

Arosio
- Former municipality
- Aerial view from 1500 m by Walter Mittelholzer (1919)

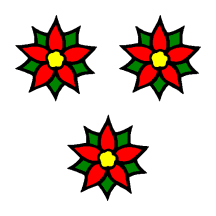
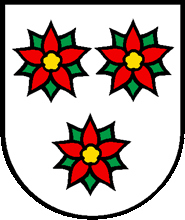
- Flag Coat of arms
- Location of Arosio
- Location within Switzerland Location within Canton of Ticino
- Coordinates: 46°02′52″N 8°54′05″E
- Country: Switzerland
- Canton: Ticino
- District: Lugano

Area
  - Total: 6.56 km^{2} (2.53 sq mi)
- Elevation: 859 m (2,818 ft)

Population (December 2002)
  - Total: 437
  - Density: 66.6/km^{2} (173/sq mi)
- Time zone: UTC+01:00 (CET)
  - Summer (DST): UTC+02:00 (CEST)
- Postal code: 6939
- SFOS number: 5145
- ISO 3166 code: CH-TI
- Surrounded by: Bedano, Bioggio, Cademario, Gravesano, Manno, Mugena, Sigirino, Torricella-Taverne
- Website: SFSO statistics

Arosio is a village and former municipality in the canton of Ticino, Switzerland.

In 2005 the municipality was merged with the other, neighboring municipalities Breno, Fescoggia, Mugena and Vezio to form a new and larger municipality Alto Malcantone.

== Location ==
The village comprised the amalgamated settlements Terra di sopra and Terra di sotto.

== Historic population ==
The historical population is given in the following table:

Year	Population Arosio
1599	ca. 300
1801	221
1850	232
1900	186
1950	197
2000	422
