= Cadempino =

- Municipality
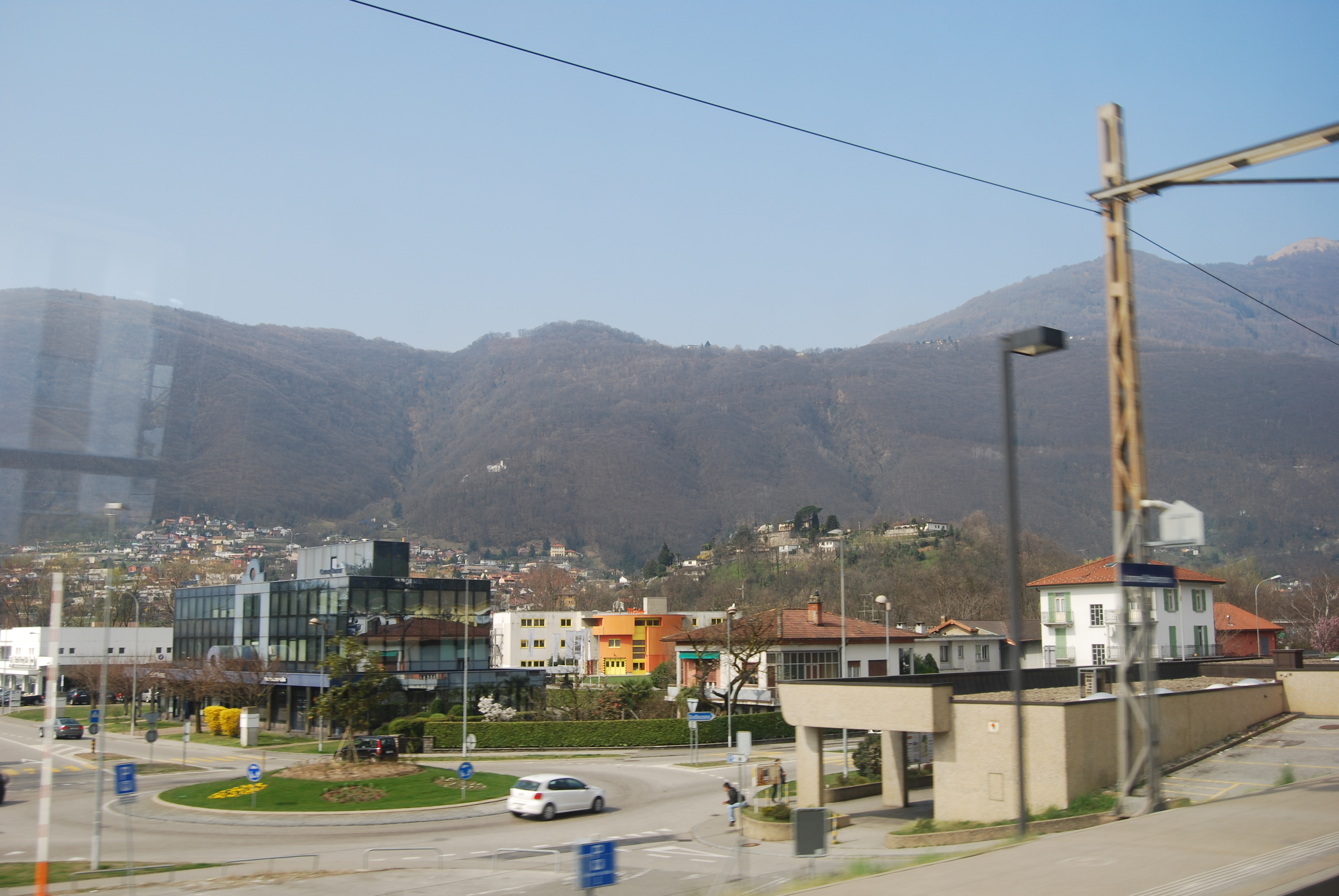
- Lamone-Cadempino Train Station

- Flag Coat of arms
- Location of Cadempino
- Location within Switzerland Location within Canton of Ticino
- Coordinates: 46°2′N 8°56′E
- Country: Switzerland
- Canton: Ticino
- District: Lugano

Government
  - Mayor: Sindaco

Area
  - Total: 0.76 km^{2} (0.29 sq mi)
- Elevation: 315 m (1,033 ft)

Population (December 2004)
  - Total: 1,388
  - Density: 1,800/km^{2} (4,700/sq mi)
- Time zone: UTC+01:00 (CET)
  - Summer (DST): UTC+02:00 (CEST)
- Postal code: 6814
- SFOS number: 5162
- ISO 3166 code: CH-TI
- Surrounded by: Cureglia, Lamone, Manno, Vezia
- Website: www.cadempino.ch

Cadempino is a municipality in the district of Lugano in the canton of Ticino in Switzerland.

== History ==
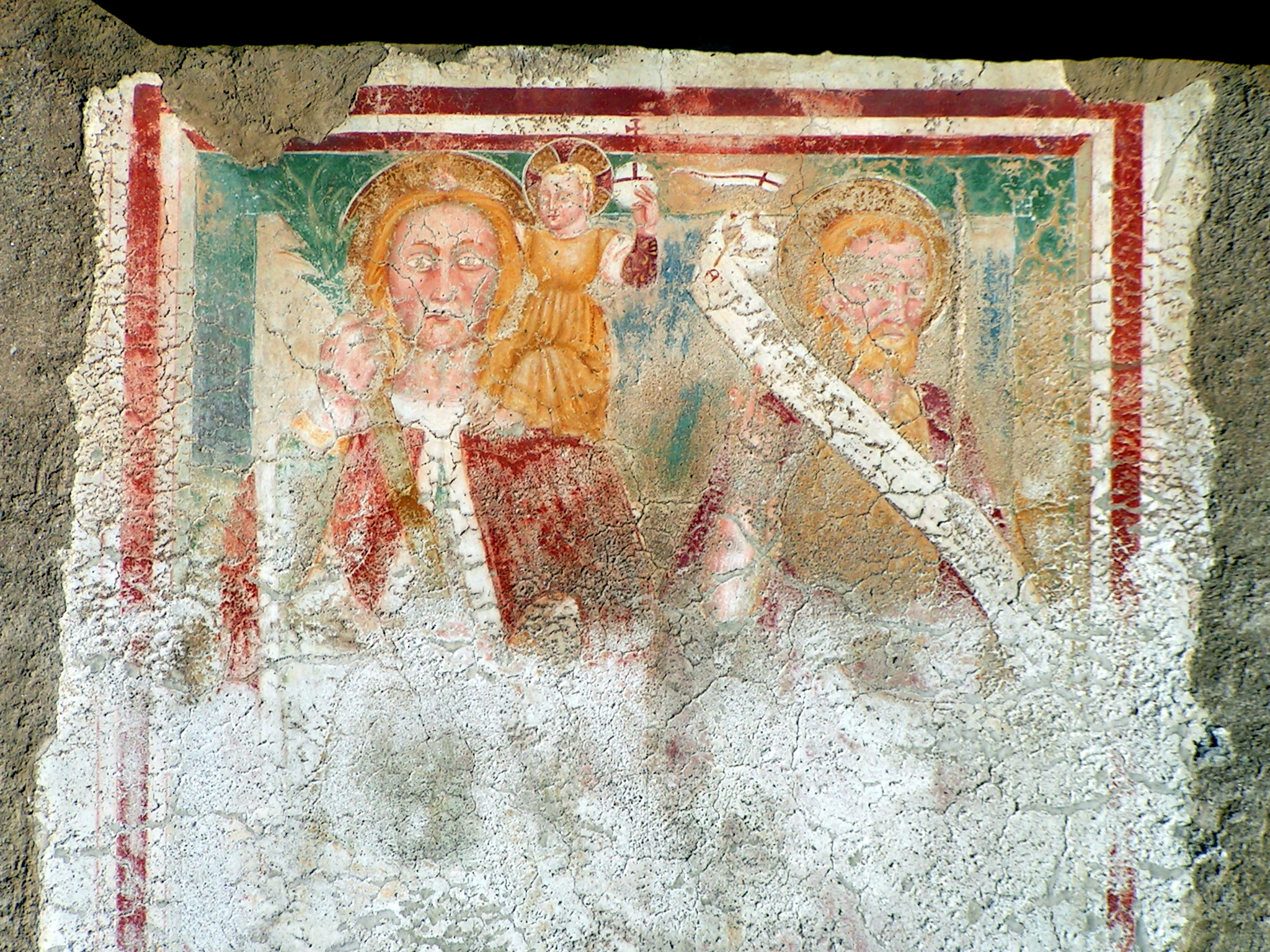
Fresco from the Church of SS Gervasio e Protasio

Cadempino is first mentioned in 1004 as Cadampinus. Originally, it was owned by the Totoniden family of Campione d'Italia. In 844 their lands, including Cadempino, were given to the monastery of S. Ambrogio in Milan. By 1004, Como Cathedral and the Abbey of San Pietro in Ciel d'Oro in Pavia, also owned property in the village.

In the 14th century the Church of SS Gervasio e Protasio was mentioned for the first time. It was part of the parish of Lamone in 1468 and in 1910 was raised to a Vicariate.

The grazing rights to the alpine meadows of Alp Traverno and Alp Guzzala were originally shared by Cadempino and Lamone. In 1507 Cadempino's rights were given to Isone. The shared grazing lands and disagreements over the border between Cadempino and Lamone led to a long-running disagreement. The two municipalities continued to fight over their mutual border until 1887.

Historically Cadempino was a farming community, with a little income from seasonal migrations and exploitation of sand pits. However, in the 20th century it changed as many industrial and commercial enterprises have settled in the municipality along the highway. The population has tripled since World War II, and is nearly one-third non-Swiss citizens. In 2001, a majority of workers (36 companies with 948 employees) worked in the industrial sector while the services sector had 75 companies but only 531 employees.

Aerial view (1964)

== Geography ==
Cadempino has an area, as of 1997, of 0.76 square kilometers (0.29 sq mi). Of this area, 0.36 km^{2} (0.14 sq mi) or 47.4% is used for agricultural purposes, while 0.19 km^{2} (0.073 sq mi) or 25.0% is forested. Of the rest of the land, 0.44 km^{2} (0.17 sq mi) or 57.9% is settled (buildings or roads).

Of the built up area, industrial buildings made up 6.6% of the total area while housing and buildings made up 30.3% and transportation infrastructure made up 14.5%. while parks, green belts and sports fields made up 6.6%. Out of the forested land, 15.8% of the total land area is heavily forested and 9.2% is covered with orchards or small clusters of trees. Of the agricultural land, 14.5% is used for growing crops, while 2.6% is used for orchards or vine crops and 30.3% is used for alpine pastures.

The municipality is located in the Lugano district, on the left bank of the Vedeggio near the Lugano Nord exit of the A2 motorway.

== Coat of arms ==
The blazon of the municipal coat of arms is Azure a sword downpointing and a palm in saltire argent and in base a church of the same roofed gules and a fir tree vert.

== Demographics ==
Cadempino has a population (as of December 2020) of 1,521. As of 2008, 30.2% of the population are resident foreign nationals. Over the last 10 years (1997–2007) the population has changed at a rate of 7.5%.

Most of the population (as of 2000) speaks Italian (87.3%), with German being second most common (6.3%) and French being third (1.9%). Of the Swiss national languages (as of 2000), 83 speak German, 25 people speak French, 1,150 people speak Italian, and 2 people speak Romansh. The remainder (57 people) speak another language.

As of 2008, the gender distribution of the population was 50.8% male and 49.2% female. The population was made up of 501 Swiss men (33.4% of the population), and 261 (17.4%) non-Swiss men. There were 554 Swiss women (36.9%), and 184 (12.3%) non-Swiss women.

In 2008 there were 5 live births to Swiss citizens and 4 births to non-Swiss citizens, and in same time span there were 5 deaths of Swiss citizens and 1 non-Swiss citizen death. Ignoring immigration and emigration, the population of Swiss citizens remained the same while the foreign population increased by 3. There were 3 Swiss men who immigrated back to Switzerland and 2 Swiss women who emigrated from Switzerland. At the same time, there were 6 non-Swiss men and 7 non-Swiss women who immigrated from another country to Switzerland. The total Swiss population change in 2008 (from all sources, including moves across municipal borders) was an increase of 16 and the non-Swiss population change was an increase of 63 people. This represents a population growth rate of 5.7%.

The age distribution, as of 2009, in Cadempino is; 147 children or 9.8% of the population are between 0 and 9 years old and 167 teenagers or 11.1% are between 10 and 19. Of the adult population, 154 people or 10.3% of the population are between 20 and 29 years old. 278 people or 18.5% are between 30 and 39, 269 people or 17.9% are between 40 and 49, and 189 people or 12.6% are between 50 and 59. The senior population distribution is 167 people or 11.1% of the population are between 60 and 69 years old, 77 people or 5.1% are between 70 and 79, there are 52 people or 3.5% who are over 80.

As of 2000, there were 528 private households in the municipality, and an average of 2.5 persons per household. In 2000 there were 149 single family homes (or 58.7% of the total) out of a total of 254 inhabited buildings. There were 45 two family buildings (17.7%) and 42 multi-family buildings (16.5%). There were also 18 buildings in the municipality that were multipurpose buildings (used for both housing and commercial or another purpose).

The vacancy rate for the municipality, in 2008, was 0.66%. In 2000 there were 559 apartments in the municipality. The most common apartment size was the 4 room apartment of which there were 223. There were 19 single room apartments and 123 apartments with five or more rooms. Of these apartments, a total of 526 apartments (94.1% of the total) were permanently occupied, while 27 apartments (4.8%) were seasonally occupied and 6 apartments (1.1%) were empty. As of 2007, the construction rate of new housing units was 5.1 new units per 1000 residents.

The historical population is given in the following table:

year	population
1850	157
1900	254
1950	309
1970	898
1990	1,103
2000	1,317

== Politics ==
In the 2007 federal election the most popular party was the CVP which received 25.63% of the vote. The next three most popular parties were the FDP (25.49%), the SVP (16.01%) and the Ticino League (13.79%). In the federal election, a total of 395 votes were cast, and the voter turnout was 48.8%.

In the 2007 Gran Consiglio election, there were a total of 839 registered voters in Cadempino, of which 509 or 60.7% voted. 7 blank ballots and 2 null ballots were cast, leaving 500 valid ballots in the election. The most popular party was the PLRT which received 122 or 24.4% of the vote. The next three most popular parties were; the PPD+GenGiova (with 115 or 23.0%), the LEGA (with 80 or 16.0%) and the SSI (with 78 or 15.6%).

In the 2007 Consiglio di Stato election, 8 blank ballots and 1 null ballot were cast, leaving 500 valid ballots in the election. The most popular party was the LEGA which received 126 or 25.2% of the vote. The next three most popular parties were; the PPD (with 118 or 23.6%), the PLRT (with 115 or 23.0%) and the PS (with 70 or 14.0%).

== Economy ==
As of 2007, Cadempino had an unemployment rate of 4.35%. As of 2005, there was 1 person employed in the primary economic sector and about 1 business involved in this sector. 691 people were employed in the secondary sector and there were 24 businesses in this sector. 833 people were employed in the tertiary sector, with 71 businesses in this sector. There were 705 residents of the municipality who were employed in some capacity, of which females made up 41.1% of the workforce.

In 2000, there were 1,637 workers who commuted into the municipality and 556 workers who commuted away. The municipality is a net importer of workers, with about 2.9 workers entering the municipality for every one leaving. About 34.1% of the workforce coming into Cadempino are coming from outside Switzerland. Of the working population, 10.4% used public transportation to get to work, and 67.7% used a private car.

As of 2009, there were 2 hotels in Cadempino.

== Religion ==
From the 2000 census, 1,067 or 81.0% were Roman Catholic, while 77 or 5.8% belonged to the Swiss Reformed Church. There are 121 individuals (or about 9.19% of the population) who belong to another church (not listed on the census), and 52 individuals (or about 3.95% of the population) did not answer the question.

== Education ==
The entire Swiss population is generally well educated. In Cadempino about 67.3% of the population (between age 25 and 64) have completed either non-mandatory upper secondary education or additional higher education (either University or a Fachhochschule).

In Cadempino there were a total of 256 students (as of 2009). The Ticino education system provides up to three years of non-mandatory kindergarten and in Cadempino there were 41 children in kindergarten. The primary school program lasts for five years. In the municipality, 76 students attended the standard primary schools. In the lower secondary school system, students either attend a two-year middle school followed by a two-year pre-apprenticeship or they attend a four-year program to prepare for higher education. There were 70 students in the two-year middle school and 2 in their pre-apprenticeship, while 22 students were in the four-year advanced program.

The upper secondary school includes several options, but at the end of the upper secondary program, a student will be prepared to enter a trade or to continue on to a university or college. In Ticino, vocational students may either attend school while working on their internship or apprenticeship (which takes three or four years) or may attend school followed by an internship or apprenticeship (which takes one year as a full-time student or one and a half to two years as a part-time student). There were 14 vocational students who were attending school full-time and 31 who attend part-time.

As of 2000, there were 185 students from Cadempino who attended schools outside the municipality.

== Transport ==
Cadempino is served by the Lamone-Cadempino station, situated on the border with the adjoining municipality of Lamone, which is on the Gotthard railway.
