= Someo =

Village in Switzerland

Coordinates: 46°17′N 8°40′E

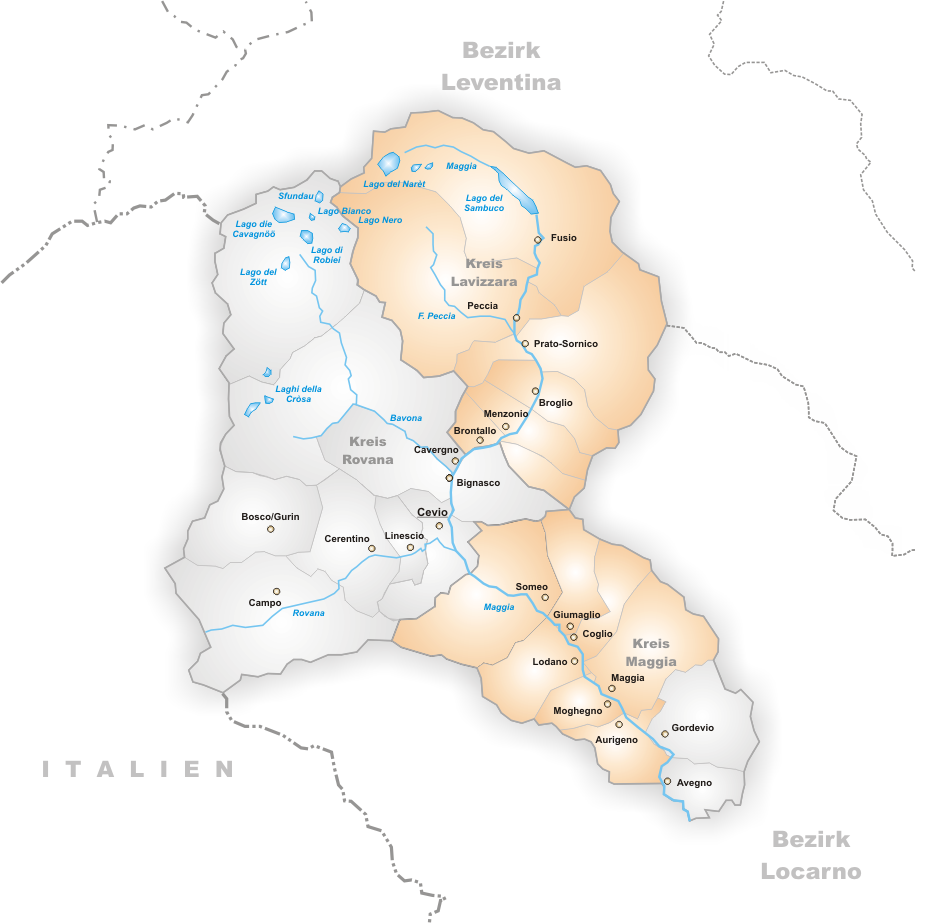
2003 map with Someo.

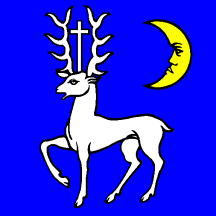
Flag of Someo.

Coat of arms of Someo.

Someo is a village and former municipality in the district of Vallemaggia in the canton of Ticino, Switzerland.

Aerial view (1954)

== Demography ==
The municipality had 258 inhabitants in 2003. The municipality had an area of 32.73 km².

In 2004 the municipality was incorporated into the larger, neighboring municipality Maggia.

== Emigration ==
In the 19th century many inhabitants migrated to France, England, California and Australia. Antonio Tognazzini founded the town Someo (now Casmalia) to honour the village of origin of his family.

The aspiration to find new opportunities abroad was widespread in some cantons of Switzerland, in particular Ticino, Fribourg and Valais.

=== Italian-Swiss Emigration ===
The people of the Italian-speaking part of Switzerland had often to migrate because the local resources were insufficient to sustain the entire population.

The migration was mainly seasonal or temporary. One could work during the summer in Milan or other Italian Cities and then go home for winter (or vice versa). With the development of transportation we find Italian-Swiss (or Ticinese, i.e. from Ticino, as they will be called here) in France, England, the Netherlands and other Western European states. In these nations the stay was often longer than a year and eventually definitive.

=== Emigration to Europe ===
For several centuries the Italian Peninsula was the main and often unique destination of the seasonal emigration. For longer periods the migrants went to France, England, the Netherlands and other European states.

In the construction sector, the Ticinese were masons, stonecutters, site foremen, stucco workers and sculptors. During the Middle Age, the Comacine masters were the most famous artists from Ticino and the Lombardy. In the 16th century the architects Domenico Fontana, Carlo Maderno and Francesco Borromini work in Rome, Florence and other Italian Cities. Later, Domenico Trezzini, Antonio Adamini, Domenico Gilardi, Giorgio Ruggia and others architects from Ticino built churches and buildings in Russia.

The people from the Blenio Valley were chocolate-makers in Milan, chestnut roasters in Lyon, Paris and others European cities, restaurant keepers in London.

The Ticinese abroad were also porters, waiters, coppersmiths (from Valcolla), knife-grinders, glaziers (from Claro), brick-makers, chimney sweeps (from Onsernone: small boys were sent scrambling up inside the chimney to scrap and brush soot away).

In the first half of the 19th century, the Ticinese in Italy were about ten thousand and every year more than ten thousand migrated to several European nations. In 1858 the Ticinese registered at the Swiss embassy in Paris were nearly eight thousand.

In 1853 general Joseph Radetzky, Viceroy of Lombardy-Venetia, ordered the deportation of all Ticinese and the closure of the border with Ticino. More than six thousand Ticinese were deported. Ticino faced a severe economic crisis because it had to feed all these people without the wheat from Italy. Two years later the order was abolished.

=== Emigration to California ===
The emigration of Ticinese to California in the 19th century started with the California Gold Rush. Two gold seekers from Leventina were the first migrants. They arrived in San Francisco in 1849. During the following years the number of migrants increased from less than 100 to several hundred. The great majority came from the northern valleys, in particular Valle Maggia and Valle Leventina. Often the Municipality or the Patriziato (Patriciate) lent the money for the trip. The emigrants would mortgage their properties or contract private loans. In the contract signed with an emigration agency, the journey and the room and board were specified. They would take a stagecoach and often had to cross the Gotthard Pass on foot. In Lucerne it was possible to take a train.

The departure ports were Le Havre, Hambourg and Antwerp, but sometimes the migrants stayed in London to work in order to pay for the trip to California.

The journey lasted several months because one had to circumnavigate South America or to disembark in Colón and cross the Isthmus of Panama. The length of the journey from New York City to San Francisco was greatly shortened when the First transcontinental railroad started to operate in 1869.

Business conditions and political and climatic events have affected the number of migrants. For instance, the closure of the border ordered by general Radetzky led to a strong increase in the number of emigrants. The main push factors were population growth, crop failures, floods, landslides and political turmoil. The main pull factors were the gold rush, availability of farm land, high paying jobs and cheaper transport costs. The American Civil War and economic recessions lowered the number of migrants.

Perret searched state and county records in California, in particular the original files of the American census of 1870, and found 882 Ticinese, though the real number was much higher. In 1930 the Swiss Americans of Ticino descent numbered about twenty thousand. The number of people that originally went to California is much greater than that, because all the Ticinese that went back home between 1870 and 1930 are not counted in the American Census of 1930.

The great majority of Ticinese were dairy farmers. In their letters to their families back home they explained the everyday hard work. They were milking about twenty cows by hand. The ranch was much bigger than an Alpine pasture. In winter they worked in sawmills or in factories.

Often a migrant started to work as a milker but then, with his savings and a bank loan, he would be able to buy a small farm. The Swiss American bank was founded in Locarno with branches in San Francisco and San Luis Obispo. The emigrants could deposit their savings and transfer some money to Ticino.

There were some miners among the emigrants, but farm work was what they knew best. Some Ticinese were winemakers (the Italian Swiss Colony was founded by some Swiss and Italian wine merchants), horticulturists, carpenters, storekeepers, hotelkeepers and bakers.

In San Francisco the Ticinese founded a mutual aid society, a patriotic society and a journal in Italian with news from Ticino and the colony.

Emigration to the United States ceased after World War II. The second generation assimilated easily and quickly, as described by the melting pot phenomenon. “Ticinese” and Italian were no longer spoken, and family connections became more difficult. The descendants are now scattered all over the United States. Family names, street names and tombstones in Catholic cemeteries are the current traces of emigration from Ticino.

A demographic disequilibrium (almost all emigrants were men) was the main negative consequence for the villages in Valle Maggia. Many women took men's jobs, and the more difficult pastures were abandoned. Emigrant remittances helped restore buildings and churches. The story of a rich uncle in America is popular in Ticino.

=== Emigration to Australia ===
The Australian gold rush in Victoria started in 1851. Several thousand European and Chinese gold diggers went to Australia scratching in the gravel with their pick and shovel. A miner’s licence had to be paid in advance (30 shillings per month). Tensions between the diggers and the authorities rose quickly. A rebellion was organised resulting in the death of over 30 people.

The first Ticinese gold diggers made a fortune. They encouraged their acquaintances to go to Australia. The journey was dangerous and lasted up to five months. The emigrants had to mortgage theirs properties or to contract a private loan. In the contract signed with an emigration agency the journey and the room and board were specified. Some emigrants were abused by dishonest emigration agencies (wrong arrival port, insufficient food). In 1874 Switzerland enacted a law to regulate these agencies.

Work in the gold fields was very hard and dangerous. The digger had to scratch from dawn to dusk and the result was highly unsure. Discouragement was widespread. The majority of emigrants came back poorer than before. The representative of Ticino for the Lugano District advised in 1863 against emigration to Australia.

Between 1850 and 1860 about 2300 Ticinese migrated to Australia. The majority came from the northern part of Ticino, in particular the Valle Maggia. A third of the emigrants remained in Australia but they had to work as farmer, vine-growers, merchants and hotelkeepers. Those staying in the gold fields had to work for mining companies in low-paid and insecure jobs.

The second generation eventually assimilated in Australian society. “Ticinese” and Italian were no longer spoken and the family connections became more difficult. The family ties with Ticino were limited to short stays during a vacation to Europe. Family names and some tombstones in Catholic cemeteries are the present traces of emigration from Ticino.

Australian people of Italian and Italian-speaking Swiss descent gather every year in Hepburn Springs for the Swiss Italian Fiesta (see Swiss Italians of Australia).

=== Emigration to Argentina ===
Several Ticinese, in particular from the Southern part of Ticino, took part in the colonization of Argentina and other South America countries. The journey to Buenos Aires with a sailing ship lasted three months. Later, with a transatlantic steamboat the journey was much shorter (one month) and safer.

Switzerland and some Swiss municipalities promoted emigration to South America. A federal office was in charge of all problems related to emigration. Until 1937 a financial aid was granted to settle in Argentina. Moreover, a Swiss Consul in Le Havre advised the migrants. Some migrants had to be protected from untrustworthy and dishonest emigration agencies.

Argentina opened a consulate in Bellinzona to encourage immigration but civil wars and coup d’état hampered this public advertising.

The number of immigrants increased sharply in the second half of the 19th century (a fivefold increase from 1869 to 1895). Living conditions were difficult because of surge of epidemics (yellow fever in 1871, cholera in 1874), political instability, civil wars and monetary depreciation.

The Ticinese lived mainly in the cities. Swiss rural colonies were founded by people from the cantons of Fribourg and Valais. The tentative of a rural colony in Paraguay by Mosé Bertoni was an interesting scientific and social experiment but an economic failure.

In the construction sector, the Ticinese were masons, stonecutters, site foremen, carpenters, architects, stucco workers and sculptors. Among the business men, the Ticinese were bankers, hotelkeepers, industrialists, engineers, doctors, pharmacists, lawyers and teachers. All other typical occupations for Ticinese abroad were found in Argentina: dairy farmers, porters, waiters, coppersmiths, knife-grinders, glaziers, brick-makers and chimney sweeps.

Mutual aid societies and patriotic societies were founded to foster the bonds among fellow countrymen. For example, the Swiss Philanthropic Society of Buenos Aires, founded in 1861, had 190 members and helped many sick and penniless Ticinese.

In his book, Pedrazzini gives a careful description of the professional and political activities of many Ticinese migrated to Argentina. The dynasties of the Bernasconi, Chiesa, de Marchi, Matti, Pellegrini, Quadri and Soldati families have played an important role in the economic and political activities of Argentina. Villa Lugano, now a working class neighbourhood in Buenos Aires, was formerly a town founded by Giuseppe (José) Soldati to honour Lugano, the city in his district of origin.

The most famous Ticinese migrant is the poet Alfonsina Storni. She was a four-year girl when her parents migrated to Argentina. Her father had opened a brewery in San Juan and later a restaurant in Rosario.

From 1869 to 1892 several hundred people left Ticino to migrate to South America. In his book, Pedrazzini gives the names and the villages of origin of 6470 migrants from Ticino. This information was obtained using consular and private registers. This old president of the Swiss Philanthropic Society of Buenos Aires estimates that migration was profitable for 10%, indifferent for 50% and negative for 40% of his fellow countrymen.

The rich migrant who came back home built magnificent villa and took part in the industrialisation of Ticino. For instance, Villa Argentina in Mendrisio was built by Antonio Croci for Giovanni Bernasconi and Villa Buenos Aires in Castel San Pietro is another illustration of past emigration to Argentina.

The second generation acquired Argentine citizenship at birth and did not speak “Ticinese” and Italian. Sometimes the name was changed to make pronunciation easy. Emigration to Argentina ceased after the Second World War and the members of patriotic societies became old and very few. Family names and tombstones are the present traces of emigration from Ticino.

== Architecture ==
Like in many other places in Ticino, there are interesting examples of architectural design, such as:

- The family house at Riveo, built in 1977 by Bruno Reichlin and Fabio Reinhart, with strong neoclassical influence.

== The official website OltreconfiniTi ==
In August 2013, the Ticinese government set up OltreconfiniTi ("beyond the borders of Ticino"), a multimedia project dedicated to emigration issues, in a bid to strengthen ties with emigrants. Several pages are dedicated to Someo and its inhabitants who moved to other countries.

== Bibliography ==
- Cheda Giorgio, L’emigrazione ticinese in Australia, Dadò, Locarno, 1976
- Cheda Giorgio, L’emigrazione ticinese in California, Dadò, Locarno, 1981
- Pedrazzini Augusto O., L’emigrazione ticinese nell’America del Sud, Tipografia Pedrazzini, Locarno, 1962
- Perret Maurice Edmond, Les colonies tessinoises en Californie, F. Rouge & Cie SA, Lausanne, 1950
- Raup H.F., « The Italian-Swiss in California », California Historical Society Quarterly, vol. 30, December 1951, pp. 305–314
- Strozzi Giuseppe, Diario d’Australia, a cura di Oliveto Rodoni, Dadò, Locarno, 1992
- Wegmann Susanne, The Swiss in Australia, Verlag Rüegger, Grüsch, 1989

Someo is also a French brand of mattresses and beds. See more about Someo (in French).
