= Lamone =

- Municipality
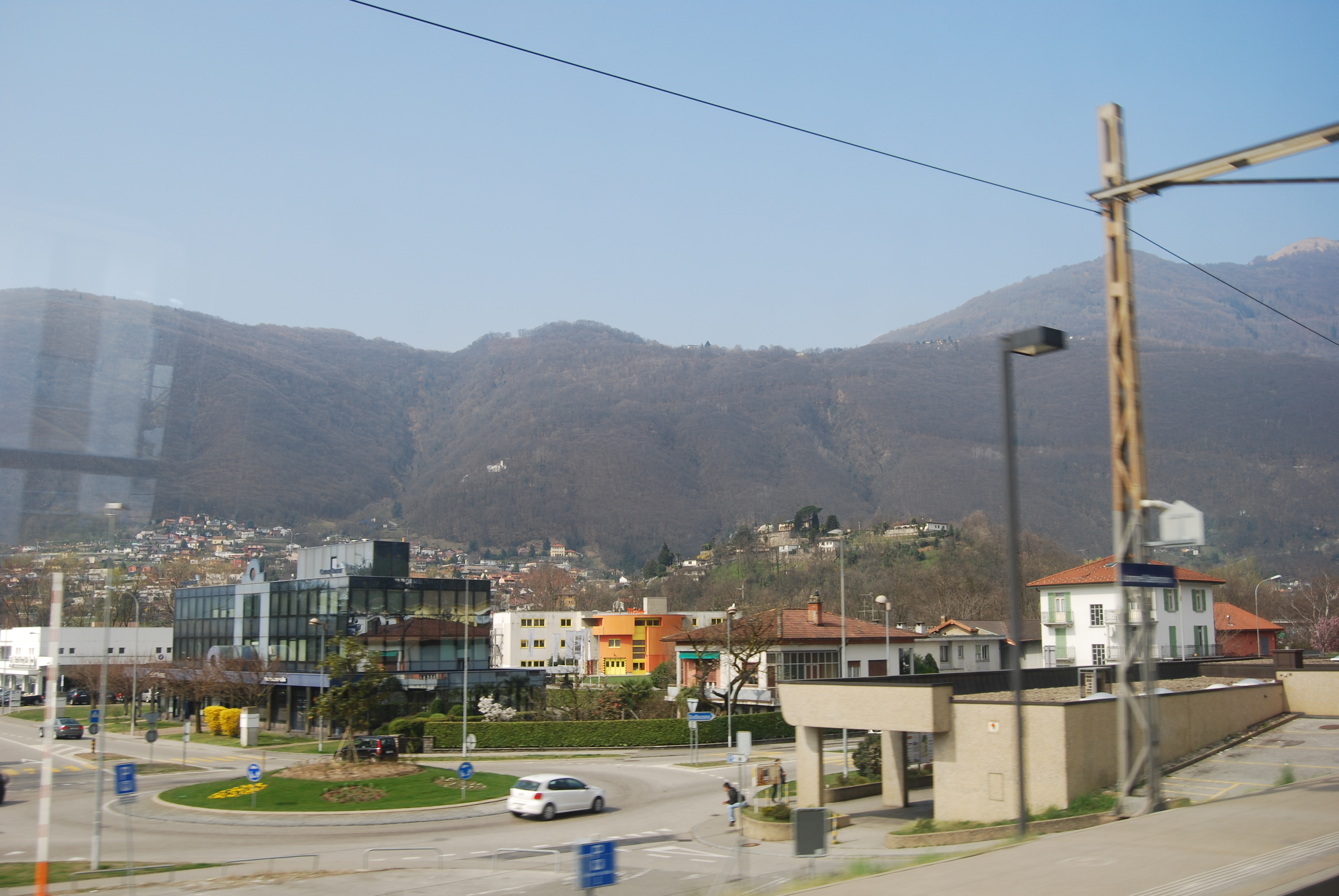

- Flag Coat of arms
- Location of Lamone
- Location within Switzerland Location within Canton of Ticino
- Coordinates: 46°3′N 8°56′E
- Country: Switzerland
- Canton: Ticino
- District: Lugano

Government
  - Mayor: Sindaco

Area
  - Total: 1.86 km^{2} (0.72 sq mi)
- Elevation: 337 m (1,106 ft)

Population (December 2004)
  - Total: 1,612
  - Density: 867/km^{2} (2,240/sq mi)
- Time zone: UTC+01:00 (CET)
  - Summer (DST): UTC+02:00 (CEST)
- Postal code: 6814
- SFOS number: 5189
- ISO 3166 code: CH-TI
- Surrounded by: Bedano, Cadempino, Cureglia, Gravesano, Manno, Origlio, Torricella-Taverne
- Website: http://www.lamone.ch/ SFSO statistics

Lamone is a municipality in the district of Lugano in the canton of Ticino in Switzerland.

== History ==
Lamone is first mentioned in 854 as Namonni. In 1295 it was mentioned as Lamono.

A prehistoric stone bowl was discovered on San Zeno hill. The first records of the village record properties and feudal rights in Lamone in the 9th century. These rights were probably held by the Benedictine Abbey of St. Ambrose in Milan and Como Cathedral. In the 15th century, the Duke of Milan acquired some of these rights. Other landholders included; in 1423, the hospital of S. Maria of Lugano, the S. Giuseppe Hospital and in 1514, the monastery of Santa Maria del Carmelo in Piacenza. In 1529, the rights of San Giuseppe and the Monastery of Santa Maria del Carmelo transferred to the Laghi family of Lugano.

The parish of Lamone (which also included Cadempino) is acknowledged as an independent parish in 1468. In 1758 it was elevated to a provostship. The Church of S. Andrea is mentioned for the first time in 1468, but it is probably from the 12th to the 13th century. In 1612 and again in the 19th century it was rebuilt. The bell tower dates from the Roman era. Next to the Oratory of St. Zeno, from the late 15th century, are the remains of a hermitage from 854.

The grazing rights that Lamone and Cadempino shared in the alpine meadows of Traverno and Guzzala, were granted to Isone in 1507. centuries of border disputes with Cadempino were finally resolved in 1887. Formerly the inhabitants of the village lived on agriculture and from money sent back by emigrants. A mill is first mentioned in 1619. Between the 18th century and about 1950 there was a sawmill and a sand quarry at Valeggia. The bridge over the Vedeggio river in Ostarietta was built in 1806–12 when the Lugano-Cadenazzo road was built. The bridge connects Lamone with the major roads and residential area on the right bank of the river. The river was redirected and put into a channel between 1906 and 1911. The village train station was built in 1923. Most of the industrial and commercial enterprises are concentrated in this flat area, along the river and the highway. The industrial growth was responsible for a large increase in population between 1950 and 1970.

== Geography ==
Aerial view (1964)

Lamone has an area, as of 1997, of 1.86 square kilometers (0.72 sq mi). Of this area, 0.52 km^{2} (0.20 sq mi) or 28.0% is used for agricultural purposes, while 0.83 km^{2} (0.32 sq mi) or 44.6% is forested. Of the rest of the land, 0.7 km^{2} (0.27 sq mi) or 37.6% is settled (buildings or roads), 0.02 km^{2} (4.9 acres) or 1.1% is either rivers or lakes and 0.03 km^{2} (7.4 acres) or 1.6% is unproductive land.

Of the built up area, industrial buildings made up 6.5% of the total area while housing and buildings made up 14.0% and transportation infrastructure made up 15.1%. Power and water infrastructure as well as other special developed areas made up 1.1% of the area while parks, green belts and sports fields made up 1.1%. Out of the forested land, 39.8% of the total land area is heavily forested and 4.8% is covered with orchards or small clusters of trees. Of the agricultural land, 7.5% is used for growing crops, while 6.5% is used for orchards or vine crops and 14.0% is used for alpine pastures. All the water in the municipality is flowing water.

The municipality is located in the Lugano district, between San Zeno hill and the left bank of the Vedeggio river. It consists of the linear village of Lamone and the hamlet of Ostarietta.

== Coat of arms ==
The blazon of the municipal coat of arms is Azure a saltire or and in base a church argent roofed gules on a mount vert issunat from base. The St. Andrew cross alludes to the patron saint of the parish church, while the church is for the chapel dedicated to St. Zeno built on the top of a hill which was a hermitage until 1832.

== Demographics ==
Lamone has a population (as of December 2020) of 1,694. As of 2008, 37.1% of the population are resident foreign nationals. Over the last 10 years (1997–2007) the population has changed at a rate of 7.9%.

Most of the population (as of 2000) speaks Italian (86.4%), with German being second most common (4.3%) and Serbo-Croatian being third (2.7%). Of the Swiss national languages (as of 2000), 68 speak German, 21 people speak French, 1,351 people speak Italian, and 6 people speak Romansh. The remainder (118 people) speak another language.

As of 2008, the gender distribution of the population was 48.3% male and 51.7% female. The population was made up of 464 Swiss men (28.9% of the population), and 311 (19.4%) non-Swiss men. There were 552 Swiss women (34.4%), and 279 (17.4%) non-Swiss women.

In 2008 there were 8 live births to Swiss citizens and 4 births to non-Swiss citizens, and in same time span there were 9 deaths of Swiss citizens and 3 non-Swiss citizen deaths. Ignoring immigration and emigration, the population of Swiss citizens decreased by 1 while the foreign population increased by 1. There was 1 Swiss man who immigrated back to Switzerland. At the same time, there were 8 non-Swiss men and 6 non-Swiss women who immigrated from another country to Switzerland. The total Swiss population change in 2008 (from all sources, including moves across municipal borders) was an increase of 28 and the non-Swiss population change was a decrease of 34 people. This represents a population growth rate of −0.4%.

The age distribution, as of 2009, in Lamone is; 152 children or 9.5% of the population are between 0 and 9 years old and 184 teenagers or 11.5% are between 10 and 19. Of the adult population, 197 people or 12.3% of the population are between 20 and 29 years old. 234 people or 14.6% are between 30 and 39, 292 people or 18.2% are between 40 and 49, and 208 people or 13.0% are between 50 and 59. The senior population distribution is 168 people or 10.5% of the population are between 60 and 69 years old, 108 people or 6.7% are between 70 and 79, there are 63 people or 3.9% who are over 80.

As of 2000, there were 632 private households in the municipality, and an average of 2.4 persons per household. In 2000 there were 140 single family homes (or 51.9% of the total) out of a total of 270 inhabited buildings. There were 52 two family buildings (19.3%) and 58 multi-family buildings (21.5%). There were also 20 buildings in the municipality that were multipurpose buildings (used for both housing and commercial or another purpose).

The vacancy rate for the municipality, in 2008, was 0.53%. In 2000 there were 714 apartments in the municipality. The most common apartment size was the 3 room apartment of which there were 277. There were 46 single room apartments and 97 apartments with five or more rooms. Of these apartments, a total of 630 apartments (88.2% of the total) were permanently occupied, while 17 apartments (2.4%) were seasonally occupied and 67 apartments (9.4%) were empty. As of 2007, the construction rate of new housing units was 0 new units per 1000 residents.

The historical population is given in the following chart:

== Politics ==
In the 2007 federal election the most popular party was the FDP which received 29.06% of the vote. The next three most popular parties were the CVP (25.46%), the Ticino League (14.75%) and the SP (14.57%). In the federal election, a total of 358 votes were cast, and the voter turnout was 45.8%.

In the 2007 Gran Consiglio election, there were a total of 776 registered voters in Lamone, of which 486 or 62.6% voted. 5 blank ballots were cast, leaving 481 valid ballots in the election. The most popular party was the PLRT which received 138 or 28.7% of the vote. The next three most popular parties were; the PPD+GenGiova (with 111 or 23.1%), the SSI (with 69 or 14.3%) and the LEGA (with 68 or 14.1%).

In the 2007 Consiglio di Stato election, 9 blank ballots and 2 null ballots were cast, leaving 475 valid ballots in the election. The most popular party was the PLRT which received 120 or 25.3% of the vote. The next three most popular parties were; the PPD (with 104 or 21.9%), the LEGA (with 103 or 21.7%) and the PS (with 65 or 13.7%).

== Economy ==
As of 2007, Lamone had an unemployment rate of 4.04%. As of 2005, there were 32 people employed in the primary economic sector and about 6 businesses involved in this sector. 415 people were employed in the secondary sector and there were 43 businesses in this sector. 495 people were employed in the tertiary sector, with 115 businesses in this sector. There were 766 residents of the municipality who were employed in some capacity, of which females made up 39.3% of the workforce.

In 2000, there were 1,246 workers who commuted into the municipality and 574 workers who commuted away. The municipality is a net importer of workers, with about 2.2 workers entering the municipality for every one leaving. About 18.0% of the workforce coming into Lamone are coming from outside Switzerland. Of the working population, 12.7% used public transportation to get to work, and 59.1% used a private car. As of 2009, there were 2 hotels in Lamone.

== Religion ==
From the 2000 census, 1,213 or 77.6% were Roman Catholic, while 76 or 4.9% belonged to the Swiss Reformed Church. There are 207 individuals (or about 13.24% of the population) who belong to another church (not listed on the census), and 68 individuals (or about 4.35% of the population) did not answer the question.

== Education ==
In Lamone about 50.2% of the population (between age 25 and 64) have completed either non-mandatory upper secondary education or additional higher education (either university or a Fachhochschule).

In Lamone there were a total of 280 students (as of 2009). The Ticino education system provides up to three years of non-mandatory kindergarten and in Lamone there were 38 children in kindergarten. The primary school program lasts for five years. In the municipality, 78 students attended the standard primary schools. In the lower secondary school system, students either attend a two-year middle school followed by a two-year pre-apprenticeship or they attend a four-year program to prepare for higher education. There were 80 students in the two-year middle school and 1 in their pre-apprenticeship, while 20 students were in the four-year advanced program.

The upper secondary school includes several options, but at the end of the upper secondary program, a student will be prepared to enter a trade or to continue on to a university or college. In Ticino, vocational students may either attend school while working on their internship or apprenticeship (which takes three or four years) or may attend school followed by an internship or apprenticeship (which takes one year as a full-time student or one and a half to two years as a part-time student). There were 16 vocational students who were attending school full-time and 45 who attend part-time.

The professional program lasts three years and prepares a student for a job in engineering, nursing, computer science, business, tourism and similar fields. There were 2 students in the professional program.

As of 2000, there were 242 students in Lamone who came from another municipality, while 161 residents attended schools outside the municipality.

== Transport ==
Lamone is served by the Lamone-Cadempino station, situated on the border with the adjoining municipality of Cadempino. The Taverne-Torricella station is also partly situated in the municipality. Both stations are on the Gotthard railway.
