= Mugena =

Coordinates: 46°03′N 8°53′E

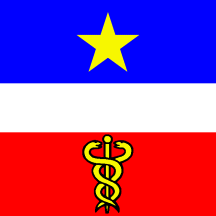
Flag

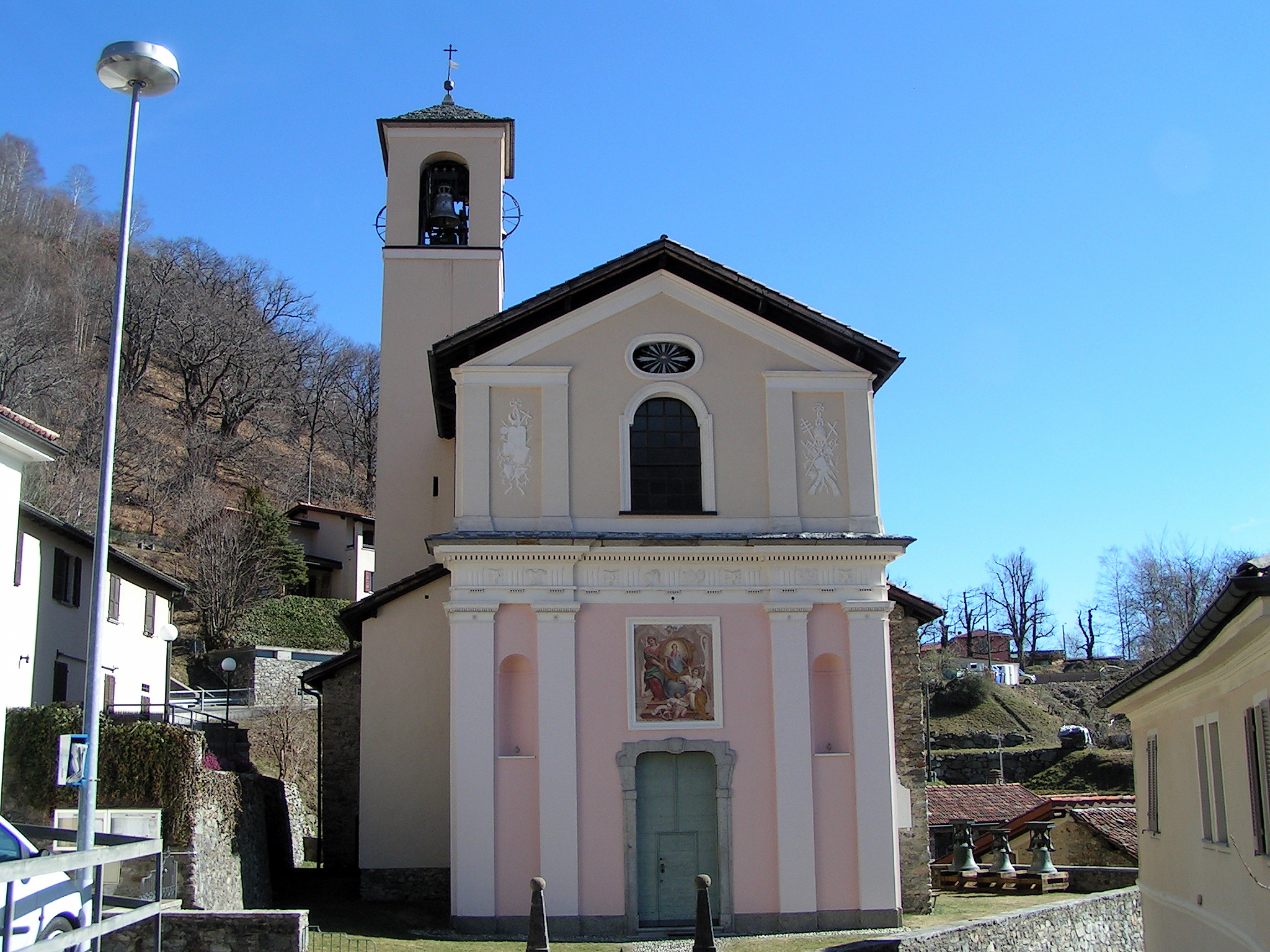
Church of Sant'Agata in Mugena

Mugena is a village and former municipality in the canton of Ticino, Switzerland.

In 2005 the municipality was merged with the other, neighboring municipalities Arosio, Breno, Fescoggia and Vezio to form a new and larger municipality Alto Malcantone.

== History ==
Mugena is first mentioned in 1214 as Megiadina. In 1270 it was mentioned as Migena.

A random discovery led to the excavation of a Roman cremation cemetery. In the Middle Ages, Como Cathedral possessed property, tithes and rights to use alpine meadows over half of Nisciora Alp. Some documents mention a castrum, probably a supply camp, but his determination remains controversial. In the 13th century, Mugena belonged to the Valle d'Arosio (upper Magliasina Valley), an economic and administrative unit, which included Arosio, Breno, Cademario, Mugena, Tortoglio and Vezio.

The parish church of S. Agata is first mentioned in 1361. In 1636 it was, after Mugena separated from Breno, promoted to a vice parish. The church was renovated and toward the end of the 17th century, completely rebuilt. The current church features valuable stucco work from the 18th century.

The village has retained its rural appearance. Historically, farming and grazing in the alpine meadows of S. Maria and Cervello were the main source of income. At the beginning of the 21st century, most residents in the valley work in Lugano.

== Historic population ==
The historical population is given in the following table:

Year	Population Mugena
1599	180
1801	108
1850	175
1900	157
1950	150
2000	141
