= Fescoggia =

Coordinates: 46.033°N 8.867°E

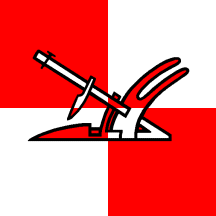
Flag of Fescoggia

Fescoggia is a village and former municipality in the canton of Ticino, Switzerland.

In 2005 the municipality was merged with the other, neighboring municipalities Arosio, Breno, Mugena and Vezio to form a new and larger municipality Alto Malcantone.
