= Breno, Ticino =

Breno
- Former municipality
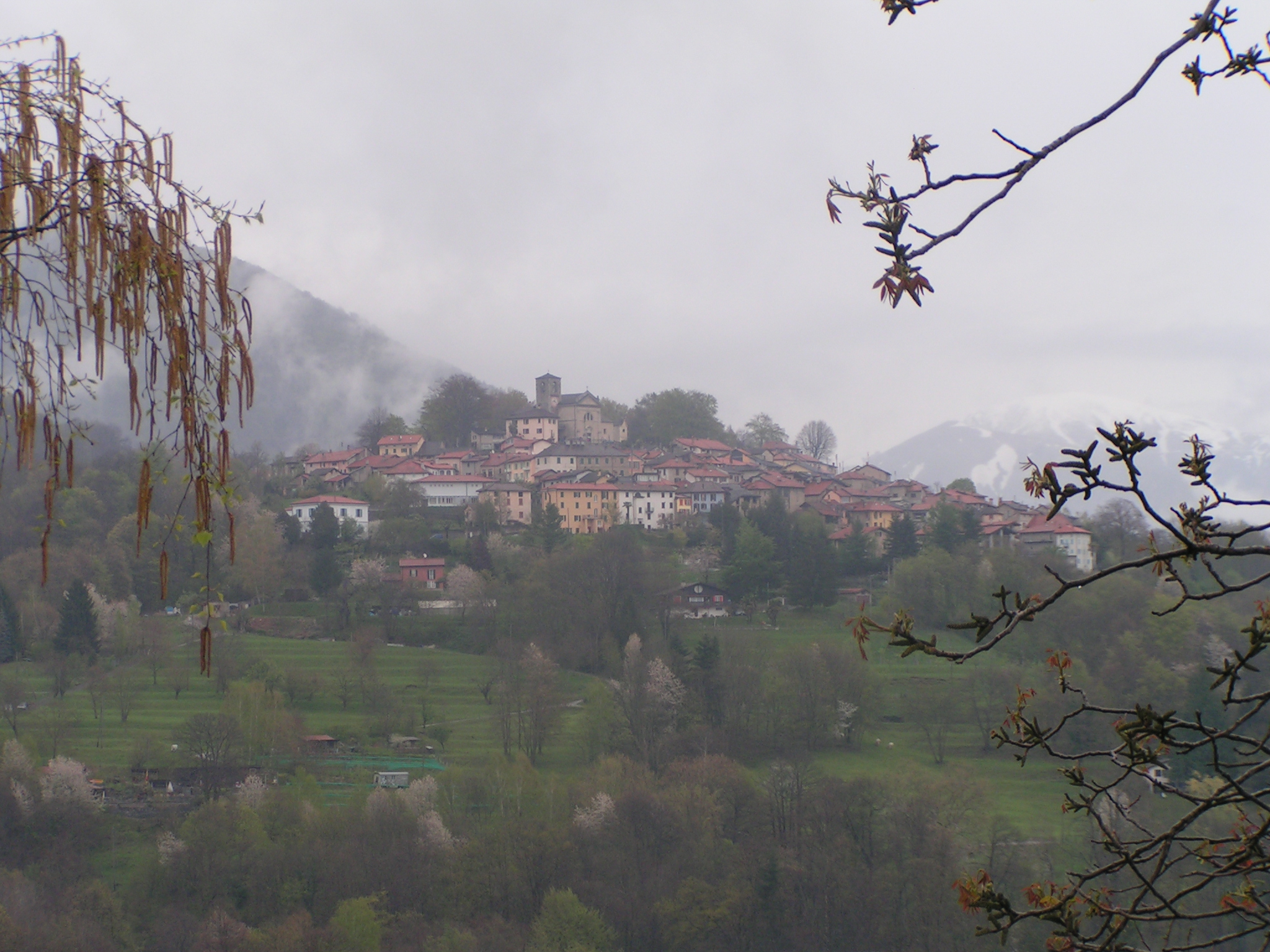

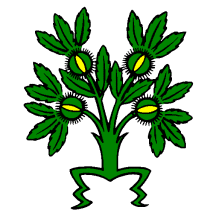
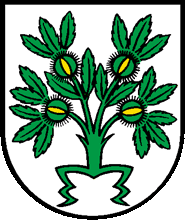
- Flag Coat of arms
- Location of Breno
- Location within Switzerland Location within Canton of Ticino
- Coordinates: 46°02′N 8°53′E
- Country: Switzerland
- Canton: Ticino
- District: Lugano

Area
  - Total: 5.24 km^{2} (2.02 sq mi)
- Elevation: 798 m (2,618 ft)

Population (31 December 2000)
  - Total: 255
  - Density: 48.7/km^{2} (126/sq mi)
- Time zone: UTC+01:00 (CET)
  - Summer (DST): UTC+02:00 (CEST)
- Postal code: 6937
- SFOS number: 5159
- ISO 3166 code: CH-TI
- Surrounded by: Aranno, Curiglia con Monteviasco (Italy), Fescoggia, Miglieglia
- Website: SFSO statistics

Breno is a village and former municipality in the canton of Ticino, Switzerland.

In 2005 the municipality was merged with the other, neighboring municipalities Arosio, Fescoggia, Mugena and Vezio to form a new and larger municipality Alto Malcantone.

== History ==
Breno is first mentioned in 1140 as Breno.

Archaeological digs have uncovered items from the Roman era in Breno. The village name is Celtic in origin, though the exact meaning is unknown. At some time after the year 1000, the Abbey of S. Abbondio in Como acquired some rights and land in Breno. The municipality bought itself out from under those rights in 1579. Modernly, the village includes the south land that once belonged to the municipality of Tortoglio. This land was abandoned in the wake of a plague in the 15th Century. The village was involved in a land dispute with Miglieglia until 1890.

The parish was established as Fescoggia parish in 1592. The Parish Church of S. Lorenzo was built in 1233, rebuilt in 1596 and expanded in 1852.

The local economy included both agriculture and herding in alpine pastures. Alp Rettaiola (alpine pasture) was lost after a century-long dispute with the Italian Valle Veddasca, following a by a decision of the Varese Congress in 1752. In the upper Malcantone Valley many of the farmers own land both in the Valley and in the lower, hilly area between Neggio and Bosco Luganese. Before winter sets in, they move their animals down into the hills to their winter pastures. The seasonal migration began in the 16th century and was very common until the beginning of the 19th century. Between 16th and 19th centuries, limited land and resources led to a large exodus of construction workers from Breno. A strong philanthropic attitude and community life, often supported by grants from wealthy villagers who had emigrated, allowed the village to build a number of institutions in the 19th century. The most important is the school of drawing from 1883. By the end of the 20th century, many of the workers in Breno commuted to Lugano for work.

== Historic population ==
The historical population is given in the following table:

Year	Population Breno
1599	-
1692	521
1801	459
1850	395
1900	398
1950	281
1990	197
2000	255

== See also ==
- Dragon of Breno
