= Francesco Carlo Rusca =

Italian painter

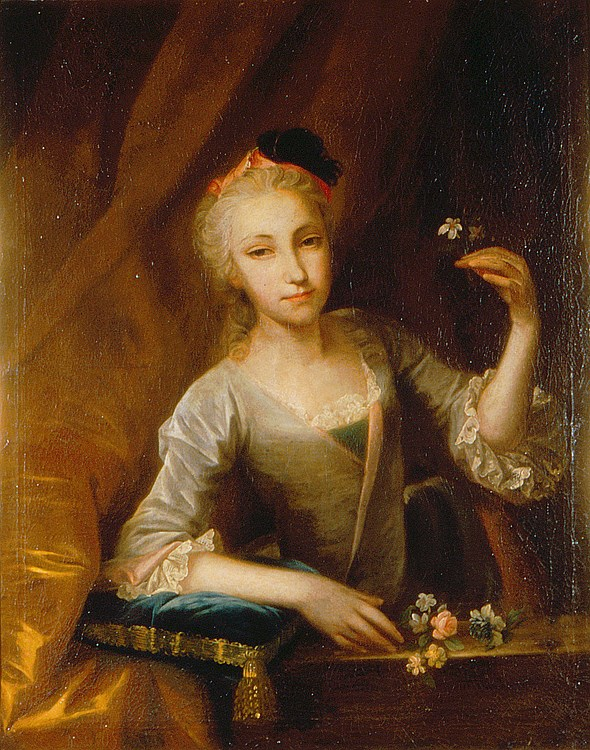
Marie Ana Ludowiga von Roll von Emmenholz (1760s)

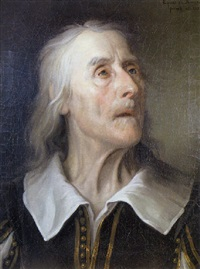
Portrait of an Actor (1730s)

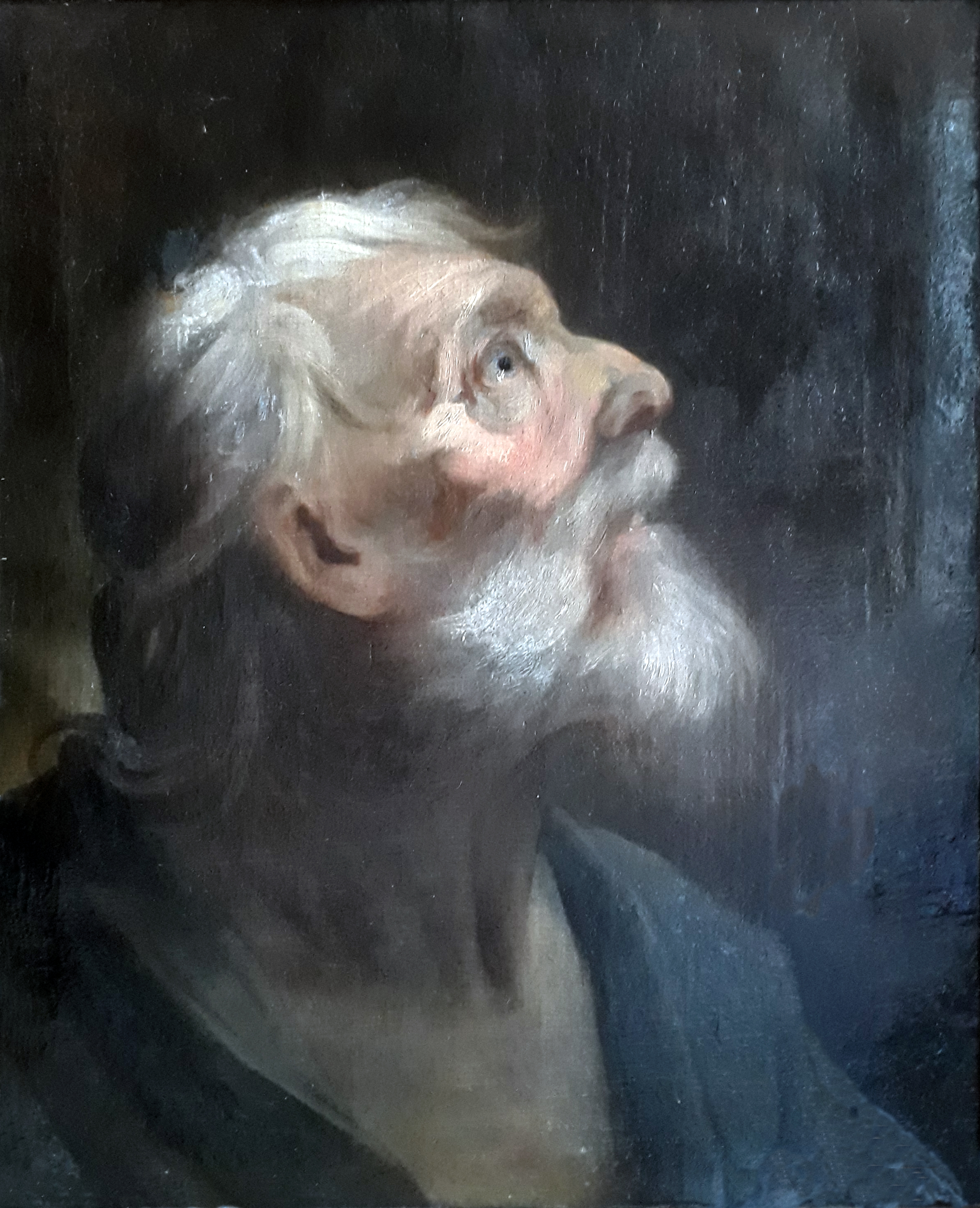
Vision of St. John the Evangelist (1737)

Francesco Carlo Rusca, or Carlo Francesco Rusca, also known as Ritter von Rusca (1 January 1693 – 11 May 1769) was an itinerant Italian-Swiss painter, best known for his portraits.

== Life and work ==
Little is known of his early life. He was born in Torricella, and studied law at the University of Turin, where he may have earned his doctorate. He soon turned to painting, however, but had difficulty obtaining clients so, sometime in the 1720s, went to Venice and became a student of Jacopo Amigoni. The works of Titian and Paolo Veronese were especially influential. He first gained attention at this time with portraits of the Sardinian royal family. Later, he returned to Switzerland, working in Solothurn and Bern.

His connection with Germany began when he married in St. Blasien. In 1733, he went to Kassel at the invitation of Landgrave William VIII, for whom he created several large portraits. His wife died in 1735 and, the following year, he moved to Hannover then, in 1737, on to Potsdam and Berlin, where he painted for the Prussian royal family. He also worked in Wolfenbüttel and Braunschweig from 1738 to 1739.

That year, he settled in London. His portraits were so well thought of that King George II called him "Cavaliere", which is why he later referred to himself as "Ritter" (Knight). He left England a few years later and returned to Italy. While there, in the 1750s, he was employed by a branch of the Spanish royal family. He continued to travel throughout Italy, using Milan as his home base, until his death there, aged 76.
