= Vezio =

Village in Ticino, Switzerland

- Former municipality
- Aerial view (1948)

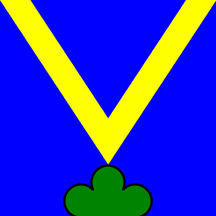
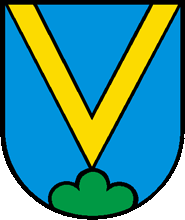
- Flag Coat of arms
- Location of Vezio
- Location within Switzerland Location within Canton of Ticino
- Coordinates: 46°02′44″N 8°52′58″E
- Country: Switzerland
- Canton: Ticino
- District: Locarno

Area
  - Total: 3.67 km^{2} (1.42 sq mi)
- Elevation: 782 m (2,566 ft)

Population (2002)
  - Total: 208
  - Density: 56.7/km^{2} (147/sq mi)
- Time zone: UTC+01:00 (CET)
  - Summer (DST): UTC+02:00 (CEST)
- Postal code: 6938
- SFOS number: 5232
- ISO 3166 code: CH-TI
- Surrounded by: Fescoggia, Mugena, Curiglia con Monteviasco (Italy)
- Website: SFSO statistics

Vezio is a village and former municipality in the canton of Ticino, Switzerland.

In 2005 the municipality was merged with the other, neighboring municipalities Arosio, Breno, Fescoggia and Mugena to form a new and larger municipality Alto Malcantone.

== Historic population ==
The historical population is given in the following table:

Year	Population Vezio
1670	194
1801	171
1850	273
1990	171
