= Fabio Reinhart =

Swiss architect

Fabio Reinhart (born 23 March 1942 in Bellinzona) is a Swiss architect. He promotes sustainable design principles within the architectural community

== Biography ==
Reinhart studied architecture at the Polytechnic of Zürich, where he graduated in 1969.

In the 1970s he became associated with Bruno Reichlin and opened a practice in Lugano. They were strongly influenced by Italian architect Aldo Rossi.

Reinhart has been a professor of architecture at the ETH Zurich since 1985, and at the Gesamthochschule Kassel since 1987.

== Reference works ==
- Tonini House, Torricella-Taverne, Switzerland (1974)
- Sartori House, Riveo, Switzerland (1976)
- Croci House, Mendrisio, Switzerland (1979–89)
- Factory at Coesfeld-Lette, Germany (1983-7; with Santiago Calatrava)
- Motorway hotel, Bellinzona, Switzerland (1990)
- Parliament of Albania, Tirana, Albania (2007)
