= Alto Malcantone =

- Municipality
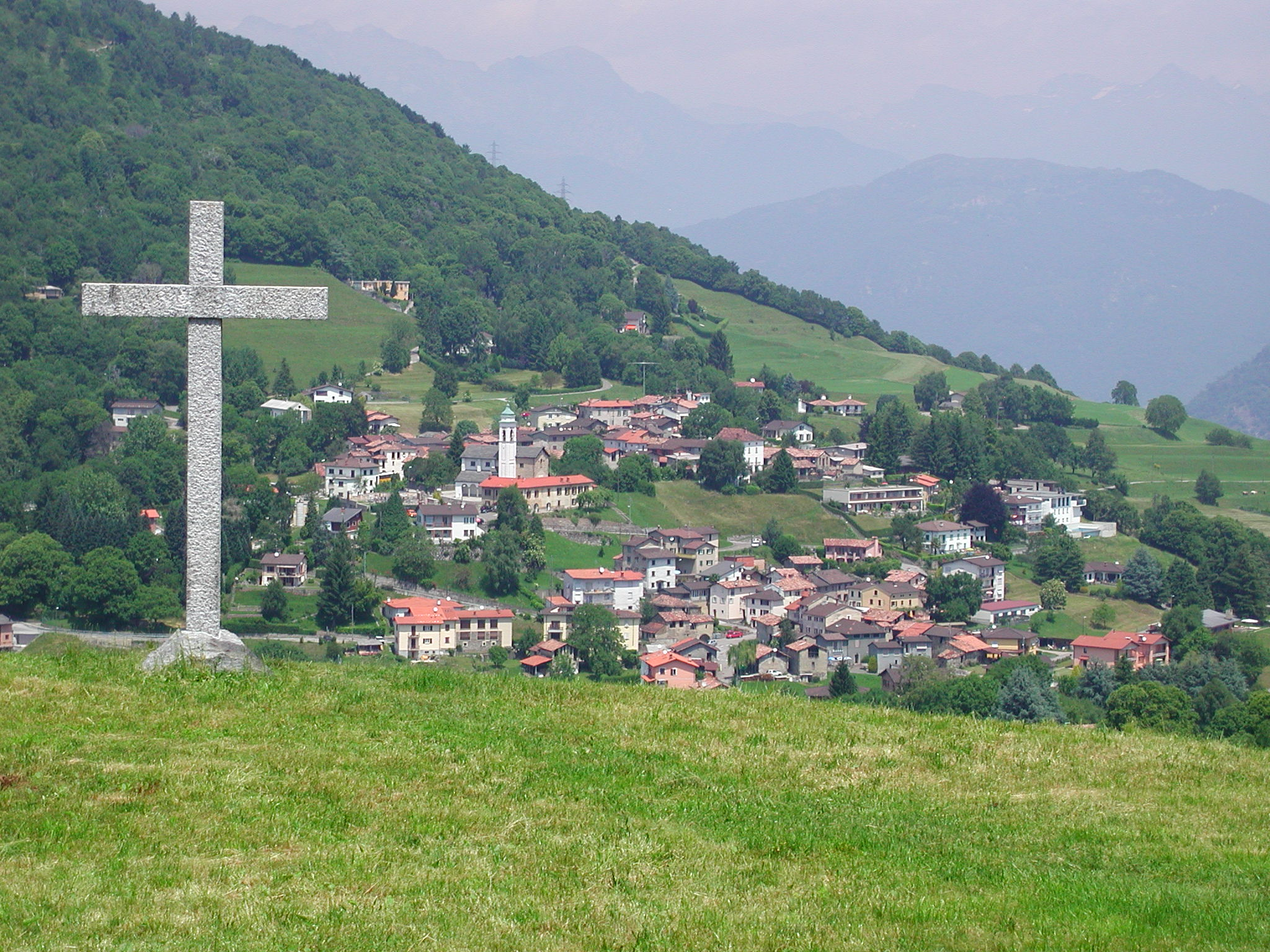
- Arosio village

- Flag Coat of arms
- Location of Alto Malcantone
- Location within Switzerland Location within Canton of Ticino
- Coordinates: 46°2′N 8°53′E
- Country: Switzerland
- Canton: Ticino
- District: Lugano

Government
  - Mayor: Sindaco

Area
  - Total: 22.1 km^{2} (8.5 sq mi)
- Elevation: 810 m (2,660 ft)

Population (December 2004)
  - Total: 1,214
  - Density: 54.9/km^{2} (142/sq mi)
- Time zone: UTC+01:00 (CET)
  - Summer (DST): UTC+02:00 (CEST)
- Postal code: 6937-6939
- SFOS number: 5237
- ISO 3166 code: CH-TI
- Surrounded by: Aranno, Bedano, Bioggio, Cademario, Curiglia con Monteviasco (IT-VA), Gambarogno, Gravesano, Manno, Miglieglia, Sigirino, Torricella-Taverne
- Website: www.altomalcantone.ch

Alto Malcantone is a municipality in the district of Lugano in the canton of Ticino in Switzerland. It was formed on 13 March 2005 from the earlier municipalities of Arosio, Breno, Fescoggia, Mugena and Vezio.

== History ==
Arosio is first mentioned in 1335 as Aroxio. Breno is first mentioned in 1140 as Breno. Fescoggia is first mentioned in 1296 as Fescozia. Mugena is first mentioned in 1214 as Megiadina. In 1270 it was mentioned as Migena. Vezio is first mentioned in 1355 as Vecio.

=== Arosio ===
According to tradition, the Roman road leading from Ponte Tresa to Monte Ceneri Pass ran through Arosio. By the Middle Ages it was a central town in the upper Magliasina valley, which was at that time was known as the Valle d'Arosio. The villages of Arosio, Breno, Cademario, Mugena Tortoglio and Vezio formed an economic and political unit.

The Church of San Michele is first mentioned in 1217. In 1640-47 it was totally rebuilt. It contains a cycle of frescoes by Antonio da Tradate and notable stucco work by local artists from the 17th and 18th centuries. At one time, the architects and master builders of Arosio operated throughout Europe.

The local economy was based on agriculture and herding in the alpine meadows. In recent decades the services sector dominated the local economy. After 1960, a number of new houses were built in the village.

=== Breno ===
Archaeological digs have uncovered items from the Roman era in Breno. The village name is Celtic in origin, though the exact meaning is unknown. At some time after the year 1000, the Abbey of S. Abbondio in Como acquired some rights and land in Breno. The municipality bought itself out from under those rights in 1579. Modernly, the village includes the south land that once belonged to the municipality of Tortoglio. This land was abandoned in the wake of a plague in the 15th century. The village was involved in a land dispute with Miglieglia until 1890.

The parish was established as Fescoggia parish in 1592. The Parish Church of S. Lorenzo was built in 1233, rebuilt in 1596 and expanded in 1852.

The local economy included both agriculture and herding in alpine pastures. Alp Rettaiola (alpine pasture) was lost after a century-long dispute with the Italian Valle Veddasca, following a by a decision of the Varese Congress in 1752. In the upper Malcantone Valley many of the farmers own land both in the Valley and in the lower, hilly area between Neggio and Bosco Luganese. Before winter sets in, they move their animals down into the hills to their winter pastures. The seasonal migration began in the 16th century and was very common until the beginning of the 19th century. Between 16th and 19th centuries, limited land and resources led to a large exodus of construction workers from Breno. A strong philanthropic attitude and community life, often supported by grants from wealthy villagers who had emigrated, allowed the village to build a number of institutions in the 19th century. The most important is the school of drawing from 1883. By the end of the 20th century, many of the workers in Breno commuted to Lugano for work.

=== Fescoggia ===
According to a 1296 document Fescoggia was one of only two villages that was in the Lugano area, but was totally owned by Como Cathedral. The Monastery of S. Abbondio in Como owned the tithe right in the village, but sold it in 1579 to Breno.

Fescoggia belongs to the parish of Breno. The Chapel of S. Silvester was built in the late 13th century, over the ruins of a church dedicated to Madonna of the snows. It was renovated in the late 18th century.

In the 15th century, the village area also included Monti di Lot and Alp Firinesc. Until the end of the 19th century, the inhabitants also drove their animals in a seasonal migration to alpine pastures to the east slopes of the mountains of Santa Maria and Cervello. On Monte Torri, in the 19th century, an iron ore (hematite) mine opened a furnace for smelting operation was built. In 2000, more than four-fifths of the workers living in Fescoggia were commuters.

=== Mugena ===
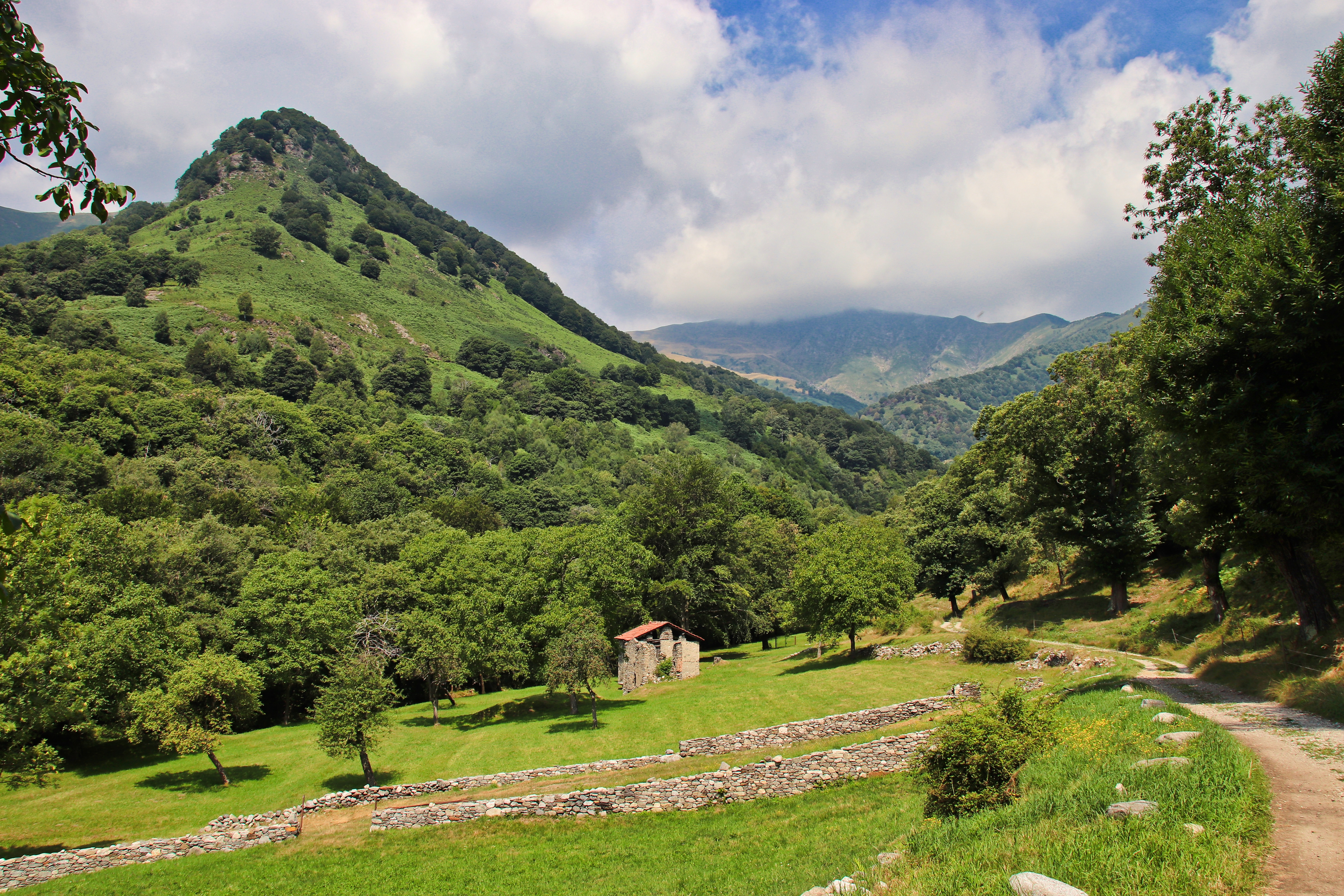
View of the upper Magliasina valley from the chestnut footpath

A random discovery led to the excavation of a Roman cremation cemetery. In the Middle Ages, Como Cathedral possessed property, tithes and rights to use alpine meadows over half of Nisciora Alp. Some documents mention a castrum, probably a supply camp, but his determination remains controversial. In the 13th century, Mugena belonged to the Valle d'Arosio (upper Magliasina Valley), an economic and administrative unit, which included Arosio, Breno, Cademario, Mugena, Tortoglio and Vezio.

The parish church of S. Agata is first mentioned in 1361. In 1636 it was, after Mugena separated from Breno, promoted to a vice parish. The church was renovated and toward the end of the 17th century, completely rebuilt. The current church features valuable stucco work from the 18th century.

The village has retained its rural appearance. Historically, farming and grazing in the alpine meadows of S. Maria and Cervello were the main source of income. At the beginning of the 21st century, most residents in the valley work in Lugano.

=== Vezio ===
In the Early Middle Ages, the Bishop and monastery of St. Abbondio in Como owned property and rights in Vezio. It was part of the parish of Breno until 1626, when it became part of the Mugena parish. It was established in 1684 as a vice-parish.

The parish church of St. Bartholomew was built in 1745 on the grounds at a former building, which dates from 1444. Inside the church there are fine stucco by artists from the Malcantone Valley.

Until the Second World War there was a strong migration of construction workers to jobs outside Switzerland. Until the late 19th century, part of the population seasonally migrated to the eastern slopes of the mountains of S. Maria and Cervello. In the early 20th century a small hydroelectric plant was built near the village.

== Coat of arms ==
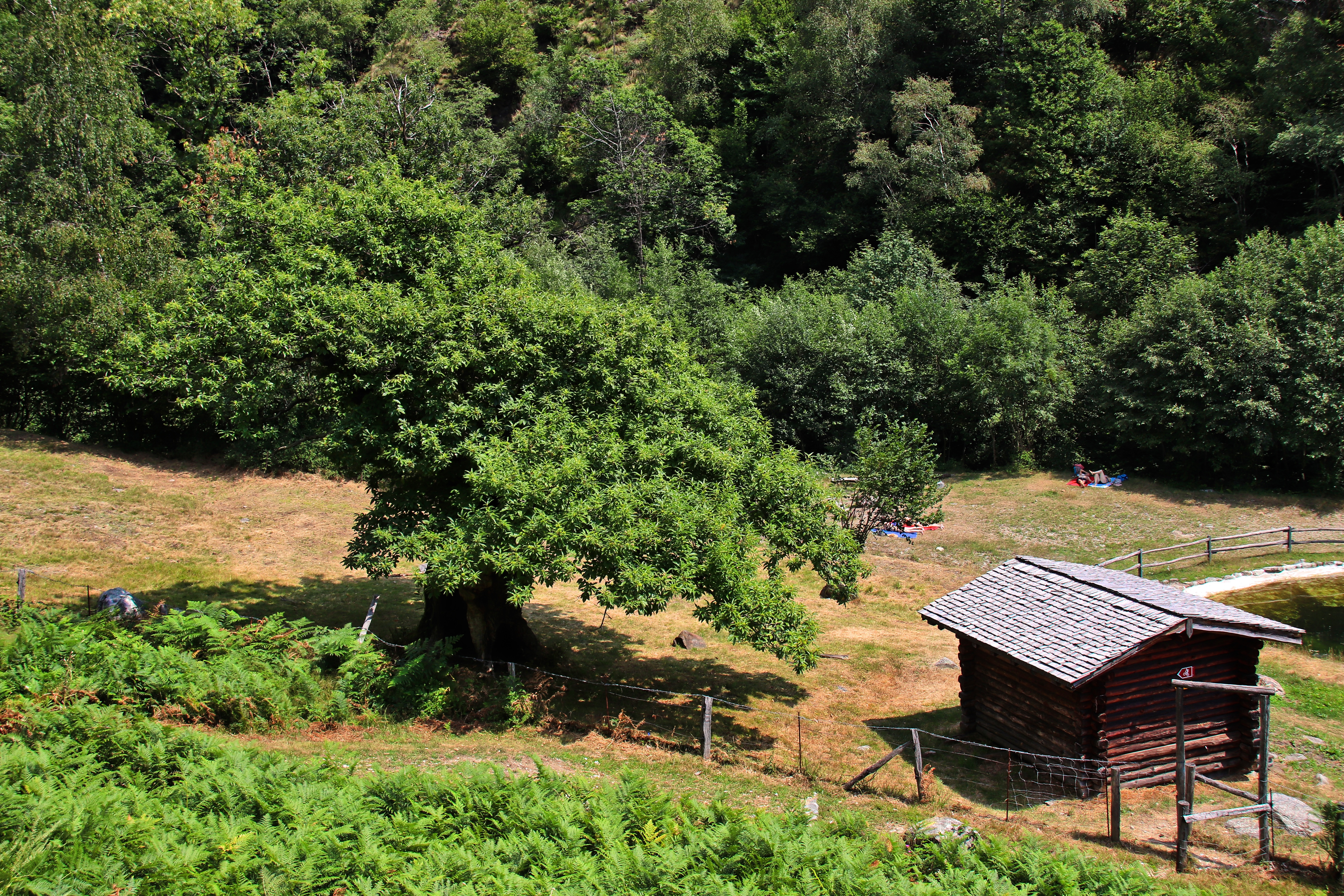
A chestnut tree near Mugena

In 2005, superseding the 5 coats of arms used by the earlier communes, the newly formed Alto Malcantone adopted a new coat of arms: Azure, a chestnut leaf in bend sinister or.

Chestnut was a staple food in Ticino until the 20th century.

== Geography ==
Aerial view from 1500 m by Walter Mittelholzer (1919)

Alto Malcantone has an area, as of 1997, of 21.92 square kilometers (8.46 sq mi). Of this area, 18.9% is used for agricultural purposes, while 67.5% is forested. Of the rest of the land, 3.1% is settled (buildings or roads) and 10.4% is unproductive land.

== Demographics ==
Alto Malcantone has a population (as of December 2020) of 1,380. As of 2008, 6.3% of the population are resident foreign nationals. Over the last 10 years (1997–2007) the population has changed at a rate of 16%.

Most of the population (as of 2000) speaks Italian (87.1%), with German being second most common (9.0%) and French being third (2.2%).

As of 2008, the gender distribution of the population was 47.8% male and 52.2% female. The population was made up of 572 Swiss men (44.2% of the population), and 47 (3.6%) non-Swiss men. There were 645 Swiss women (49.8%), and 31 (2.4%) non-Swiss women.

In 2008 there were 12 live births to Swiss citizens and 1 birth to non-Swiss citizens, and in same time span there were 12 deaths of Swiss citizens. Ignoring immigration and emigration, the population of Swiss citizens remained the same while the foreign population increased by 1. There was 1 Swiss man who immigrated back to Switzerland. At the same time, there was 1 non-Swiss man and 1 non-Swiss woman who immigrated from another country to Switzerland. The total Swiss population change in 2008 (from all sources, including moves across municipal borders) was an increase of 13 and the non-Swiss population change was a decrease of 3 people. This represents a population growth rate of 0.8%.

The age distribution, as of 2009, in Alto Malcantone is; 134 children or 10.3% of the population are between 0 and 9 years old and 133 teenagers or 10.3% are between 10 and 19. Of the adult population, 118 people or 9.1% of the population are between 20 and 29 years old. 168 people or 13.0% are between 30 and 39, 224 people or 17.3% are between 40 and 49, and 174 people or 13.4% are between 50 and 59. The senior population distribution is 164 people or 12.7% of the population are between 60 and 69 years old, 103 people or 8.0% are between 70 and 79, there are 77 people or 5.9% who are over 80.

== Historic Population ==
The historical population is given in the following table:

Year	Population Arosio	Population Breno	Population Fescoggia	Population Mugena	Population Vezio
1599	ca. 300	-	-	180	-
1692	-	521	-	-	-
1670	-	-	-	-	194
1801	221	459	131	108	171
1850	232	395	177	175	273
1900	186	398	149	157	-
1950	197	281	83	150	-
1990	-	197	105	-	171
2000	422	255	88	141	-

== Politics ==
In the 2007 federal election the most popular party was the FDP which received 30.03% of the vote. The next three most popular parties were the CVP (23.52%), the SP (21.25%) and the Ticino League (10.01%). In the federal election, a total of 464 votes were cast, and the voter turnout was 46.0%.

In the 2007 Gran Consiglio election, there were a total of 951 registered voters in Alto Malcantone, of which 623 or 65.5% voted. 6 blank ballots and 3 null ballots were cast, leaving 614 valid ballots in the election. The most popular party was the PLRT which received 180 or 29.3% of the vote. The next three most popular parties were; the PPD+GenGiova (with 115 or 18.7%), the PS (with 107 or 17.4%) and the SSI (with 94 or 15.3%).

In the 2007 Consiglio di Stato election, 8 blank ballots and 3 null ballots were cast, leaving 612 valid ballots in the election. The most popular party was the PLRT which received 166 or 27.1% of the vote. The next three most popular parties were; the PS (with 122 or 19.9%), the PPD (with 111 or 18.1%) and the LEGA (with 107 or 17.5%).

== Education ==
In Alto Malcantone about 78.5% of the population (between age 25 and 64) have completed either non-mandatory upper secondary education or additional higher education (either university or a Fachhochschule).

In Alto Malcantone there were a total of 182 students (as of 2009). The Ticino education system provides up to three years of non-mandatory kindergarten and in Alto Malcantone there were children in kindergarten. The primary school program lasts for five years and includes both a standard school and a special school. In the municipality, 66 students attended the standard primary schools and 3 students attended the special school. In the lower secondary school system, students either attend a two-year middle school followed by a two-year pre-apprenticeship or they attend a four-year program to prepare for higher education. There were 56 students in the two-year middle school, while 17 students were in the four-year advanced program.

The upper secondary school includes several options, but at the end of the upper secondary program, a student will be prepared to enter a trade or to continue on to a university or college. In Ticino, vocational students may either attend school while working on their internship or apprenticeship (which takes three or four years) or may attend school followed by an internship or apprenticeship (which takes one year as a full-time student or one and a half to two years as a part-time student). There were 14 vocational students who were attending school full-time and 22 who attend part-time.

The professional program lasts three years and prepares a student for a job in engineering, nursing, computer science, business, tourism and similar fields. There were 4 students in the professional program.

== Economy ==
As of 2007, Alto Malcantone had an unemployment rate of 3.16%. As of 2005, there were 24 people employed in the primary economic sector and about 10 businesses involved in this sector. 41 people were employed in the secondary sector and there were 14 businesses in this sector. 61 people were employed in the tertiary sector, with 22 businesses in this sector. Of the working population, 10.6% used public transportation to get to work, and 70.6% used a private car.

As of 2009, there were 2 hotels in Alto Malcantone.

== Housing ==
As of 2000 the average number of residents per living room was 0.53 which is fewer people per room than the cantonal average of 0.6 per room. In this case, a room is defined as space of a housing unit of at least 4 m^{2} (43 sq ft) as normal bedrooms, dining rooms, living rooms, kitchens and habitable cellars and attics. About 60.3% of the total households were owner occupied, or in other words did not pay rent (though they may have a mortgage or a rent-to-own agreement).

As of 2000, there were 501 private households in the municipality, and an average of 2.2 persons per household. The vacancy rate for the municipality, in 2008, was 0%. As of 2007, the construction rate of new housing units was 7.1 new units per 1000 residents.

== Heritage sites of national significance ==
The Parish Church of Di S. Michele and is listed as a Swiss heritage site of national significance. The entire village of Breno is part of the Inventory of Swiss Heritage Sites.
