= Bedano =

- Municipality
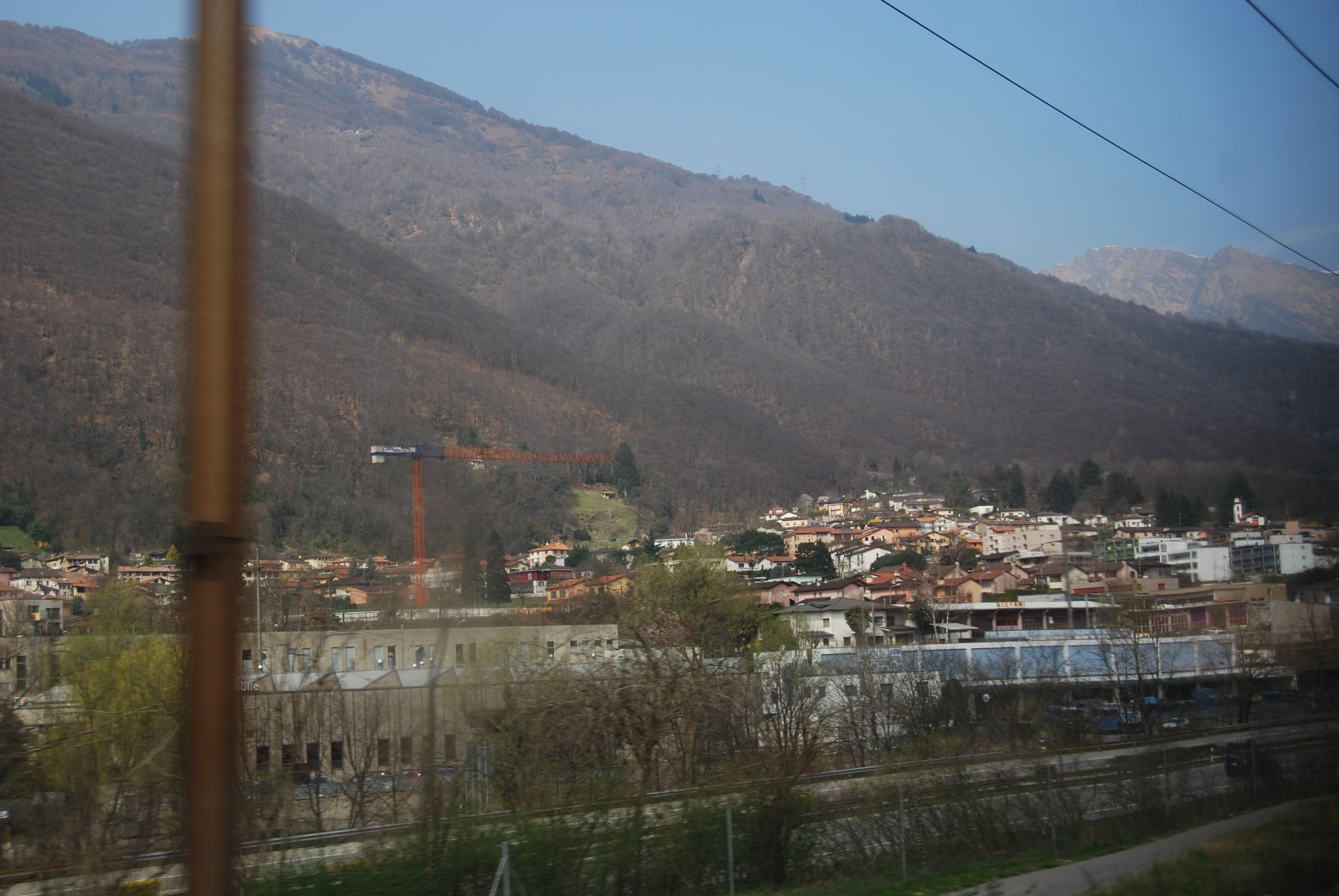

- Flag Coat of arms
- Location of Bedano
- Location within Switzerland Location within Canton of Ticino
- Coordinates: 46°03′N 8°55′E
- Country: Switzerland
- Canton: Ticino
- District: Lugano

Government
  - Mayor: Sindaco

Area
  - Total: 1.87 km^{2} (0.72 sq mi)
- Elevation: 387 m (1,270 ft)

Population (December 2004)
  - Total: 1,302
  - Density: 696/km^{2} (1,800/sq mi)
- Time zone: UTC+01:00 (CET)
  - Summer (DST): UTC+02:00 (CEST)
- Postal code: 6930
- SFOS number: 5148
- ISO 3166 code: CH-TI
- Surrounded by: Alto Malcantone, Gravesano, Lamone, Torricella-Taverne
- Website: http://www.bedano.ch SFSO statistics

Bedano is a municipality in the district of Lugano in the canton of Ticino in Switzerland.

== History ==
During the Middle Ages it was under the jurisdiction of the monastery of S. Ambrogio in Milan, while the Bishop of Como possessed the right to tithe in Bedano.

It is part of the parish of Gravesano. In the village there are two chapels, the Chapel of Santa Maria (built in 1365, rebuilt before 1636) and S. Rocco from the 16th Century. North of Bedano are ruins of a small castle, which may have belonged to the Rusca family. Under Swiss Confederation rule, it was as a part of the district of Lugano.

At times, a large percentage of the population emigrated, due to poor conditions in the village. It is the original home of the artist and architect family, Albertolli, including Giocondo Albertolli. Like the rest of Vedeggio valley, in recent decades it has experienced, industrial growth, aided by a freight rail station at Bioggio.

== Geography ==
Bedano has an area, as of 1997, of 1.87 square kilometers (0.72 sq mi). Of this area, 0.55 km^{2} (0.21 sq mi) or 29.4% is used for agricultural purposes, while 1 km^{2} (0.39 sq mi) or 53.5% is forested. Of the rest of the land, 0.52 km^{2} (0.20 sq mi) or 27.8% is settled (buildings or roads), 0.06 km^{2} (15 acres) or 3.2% is either rivers or lakes and 0.03 km^{2} (7.4 acres) or 1.6% is unproductive land.

Of the built up area, industrial buildings made up 6.4% of the total area while housing and buildings made up 13.9% and transportation infrastructure made up 6.4%. Power and water infrastructure as well as other special developed areas made up 1.1% of the area Out of the forested land, 46.5% of the total land area is heavily forested and 7.0% is covered with orchards or small clusters of trees. Of the agricultural land, 15.0% is used for growing crops and 13.9% is used for alpine pastures. All the water in the municipality is flowing water.

The municipality is located in the Lugano district, on the right bank of the Vedeggio. The old village center lies on the old Ponte Tresa to Monte Ceneri Pass road.

== Coat of arms ==
The blazon of the municipal coat of arms is Argent a fir tree vert trunked and fructed proper issuant from a base of the second.

== Demographics ==
Bedano has a population (as of December 2020) of 1,538. As of 2008, 17.8% of the population are resident foreign nationals. Over the last 10 years (1997–2007) the population has changed at a rate of 27%.

Most of the population (as of 2000) speaks Italian (88.1%), with German being second most common (7.4%) and French being third (1.3%). Of the Swiss national languages (as of 2000), 89 speak German, 15 people speak French, 1,054 people speak Italian, and 2 people speak Romansh. The remainder (36 people) speak another language.

As of 2008, the gender distribution of the population was 48.2% male and 51.8% female. The population was made up of 557 Swiss men (39.1% of the population), and 130 (9.1%) non-Swiss men. There were 629 Swiss women (44.1%), and 109 (7.6%) non-Swiss women.

In 2008 there were 13 live births to Swiss citizens and 3 births to non-Swiss citizens, and in same time span there were 5 deaths of Swiss citizens and 3 non-Swiss citizen deaths. Ignoring immigration and emigration, the population of Swiss citizens increased by 8 while the foreign population remained the same. There were 2 Swiss men who emigrated from Switzerland and 1 Swiss woman who immigrated back to Switzerland. At the same time, there were 4 non-Swiss women who immigrated from another country to Switzerland. The total Swiss population change in 2008 (from all sources, including moves across municipal borders) was an increase of 18 and the non-Swiss population change was a decrease of 13 people. This represents a population growth rate of 0.4%.

The age distribution, as of 2009, in Bedano is; 167 children or 11.7% of the population are between 0 and 9 years old and 170 teenagers or 11.9% are between 10 and 19. Of the adult population, 121 people or 8.5% of the population are between 20 and 29 years old. 211 people or 14.8% are between 30 and 39, 266 people or 18.7% are between 40 and 49, and 164 people or 11.5% are between 50 and 59. The senior population distribution is 168 people or 11.8% of the population are between 60 and 69 years old, 97 people or 6.8% are between 70 and 79, there are 61 people or 4.3% who are over 80.

As of 2000, there were 441 private households in the municipality, and an average of 2.5 persons per household. In 2000 there were 240 single family homes (or 71.4% of the total) out of a total of 336 inhabited buildings. There were 64 two family buildings (19.0%) and 20 multi-family buildings (6.0%). There were also 12 buildings in the municipality that were multipurpose buildings (used for both housing and commercial or another purpose).

The vacancy rate for the municipality, in 2008, was 0.58%. In 2000 there were 469 apartments in the municipality. The most common apartment size was the 4 room apartment of which there were 171. There were 8 single room apartments and 157 apartments with five or more rooms. Of these apartments, a total of 439 apartments (93.6% of the total) were permanently occupied, while 22 apartments (4.7%) were seasonally occupied and 8 apartments (1.7%) were empty. As of 2007, the construction rate of new housing units was 0 new units per 1000 residents.

The historical population is given in the following table:

year	population
1692	275
1801	197
1850	266
1900	243
1950	335
1960	375
1970	482
1980	731
1990	849
2000	1,196

== Politics ==
In the 2007 federal election the most popular party was the FDP which received 29.69% of the vote. The next three most popular parties were the CVP (19.98%), the SP (19.63%) and the Ticino League (14.13%). In the federal election, a total of 382 votes were cast, and the voter turnout was 45.2%.

In the 2007 Gran Consiglio election, there were a total of 849 registered voters in Bedano, of which 561 or 66.1% voted. 11 blank ballots were cast, leaving 550 valid ballots in the election. The most popular party was the PLRT which received 128 or 23.3% of the vote. The next three most popular parties were; the LEGA (with 109 or 19.8%), the SSI (with 102 or 18.5%) and the PS (with 85 or 15.5%).

In the 2007 Consiglio di Stato election, 5 blank ballots and 1 null ballot were cast, leaving 555 valid ballots in the election. The most popular party was the LEGA which received 148 or 26.7% of the vote. The next three most popular parties were; the PLRT (with 115 or 20.7%), the PS (with 103 or 18.6%) and the SSI (with 87 or 15.7%).

== Economy ==
As of 2007, Bedano had an unemployment rate of 3.14%. As of 2005, there were 25 people employed in the primary economic sector and about 5 businesses involved in this sector. 607 people were employed in the secondary sector and there were 45 businesses in this sector. 521 people were employed in the tertiary sector, with 46 businesses in this sector. There were 583 residents of the municipality who were employed in some capacity, of which females made up 41.0% of the workforce.

In 2000, there were 1,193 workers who commuted into the municipality and 455 workers who commuted away. The municipality is a net importer of workers, with about 2.6 workers entering the municipality for every one leaving. About 25.2% of the workforce coming into Bedano are coming from outside Switzerland. Of the working population, 10.5% used public transportation to get to work, and 66.4% used a private car.

As of 2009, there was one hotel in Bedano.

== Religion ==
From the 2000 census, 968 or 80.9% were Roman Catholic, while 94 or 7.9% belonged to the Swiss Reformed Church. There are 102 individuals (or about 8.53% of the population) who belong to another church (not listed on the census), and 32 individuals (or about 2.68% of the population) did not answer the question.

== Education ==
The entire Swiss population is generally well educated. In Bedano about 76.1% of the population (between age 25-64) have completed either non-mandatory upper secondary education or additional higher education (either university or a Fachhochschule).

In Bedano there were a total of 273 students (as of 2009). The Ticino education system provides up to three years of non-mandatory kindergarten and in Bedano there were 45 children in kindergarten. The primary school program lasts for five years and includes both a standard school and a special school. In the municipality, 83 students attended the standard primary schools and 4 students attended the special school. In the lower secondary school system, students either attend a two-year middle school followed by a two-year pre-apprenticeship or they attend a four-year program to prepare for higher education. There were 59 students in the two-year middle school and 1 in their pre-apprenticeship, while 30 students were in the four-year advanced program.

The upper secondary school includes several options, but at the end of the upper secondary program, a student will be prepared to enter a trade or to continue on to a university or college. In Ticino, vocational students may either attend school while working on their internship or apprenticeship (which takes three or four years) or may attend school followed by an internship or apprenticeship (which takes one year as a full-time student or one and a half to two years as a part-time student). There were 19 vocational students who were attending school full-time and 28 who attend part-time.

The professional program lasts three years and prepares a student for a job in engineering, nursing, computer science, business, tourism and similar fields. There were 4 students in the professional program.

As of 2000, there were 185 students from Bedano who attended schools outside the municipality.

== Transport ==
Bedano is served by the Taverne-Torricella station, situated on the border with the adjoining municipality of Lamone and Torricella-Taverne. The station is on the Gotthard railway.
