= Manno =

- Municipality
- Flag Coat of arms
- Location of Manno
- Location within Switzerland Location within Canton of Ticino
- Coordinates: 46°2′N 8°55′E
- Country: Switzerland
- Canton: Ticino
- District: Lugano

Government
  - Mayor: Sindaco

Area
  - Total: 2.38 km^{2} (0.92 sq mi)
- Elevation: 341 m (1,119 ft)

Population (December 2004)
  - Total: 1,134
  - Density: 476/km^{2} (1,230/sq mi)
- Time zone: UTC+01:00 (CET)
  - Summer (DST): UTC+02:00 (CEST)
- Postal code: 6928
- SFOS number: 5194
- ISO 3166 code: CH-TI
- Surrounded by: Alto Malcantone, Bioggio, Cadempino, Gravesano, Lamone, Vezia
- Website: www.manno.ch

Manno is a municipality in the district of Lugano in the canton of Ticino in Switzerland.

== History ==
Manno is first mentioned in 1184.

In 1298, the Bishop of Como owned estates in the village. In 1335, the village divided into two sections, Manno superiore and Manno inferiore, both of which belonged to the Kastlanei of Grumo which was a district of Gravesano. The parish of St. Peter's Church is still tied to Gravesano. The Oratory of St. Rocco was built in 1597 on the foundations of an earlier chapel.

Until the 1950s, the region was predominantly agricultural. In recent decades, it has grown due an influx of commuters who work in Lugano. Due to good transportation connections numerous industrial and commercial businesses have settled in the municipality. Manno has also become an important service center, since 1992 it has been the seat of the Swiss National Supercomputing Centre. In 1990-96 it was home to the UBS administrative center for Suglio-Lugano and since 1997 the Scuola universitaria professionale della Svizzera italiana (university of Italian Switzerland). In 2005, the services sector provided nearly four fifths of the jobs in the community.

== Geography ==
Manno has an area, as of 1997, of 2.38 square kilometers (0.92 sq mi). Of this area, 0.77 km^{2} (0.30 sq mi) or 32.4% is used for agricultural purposes, while 0.97 km^{2} (0.37 sq mi) or 40.8% is forested. Of the rest of the land, 0.86 km^{2} (0.33 sq mi) or 36.1% is settled (buildings or roads), 0.04 km^{2} (9.9 acres) or 1.7% is either rivers or lakes and 0.01 km^{2} (2.5 acres) or 0.4% is unproductive land.

Of the built up area, industrial buildings made up 10.9% of the total area while housing and buildings made up 10.5% and transportation infrastructure made up 12.6%. Power and water infrastructure as well as other special developed areas made up 1.7% of the area Out of the forested land, 34.5% of the total land area is heavily forested and 6.3% is covered with orchards or small clusters of trees. Of the agricultural land, 20.2% is used for growing crops, while 1.7% is used for orchards or vine crops and 10.5% is used for alpine pastures. All the water in the municipality is flowing water.

The municipality is in the Lugano district, in the Vedeggio valley. It consists of the village center of Manno, a residential section on a nearby hill, and an industrial zone on the valley floor.

== Coat of arms ==
The blazon of the municipal coat of arms is Quartered first gules a hand dexter in bend issuant from base sinister second and third sable and fourth gules a chief argent. This is an example of canting as mano is Italian for hand.

== Demographics ==
Manno has a population (as of December 2020) of 1,290. As of 2008, 18.0% of the population are resident foreign nationals. Over the last 10 years (1997–2007) the population has changed at a rate of 14.8%.

Most of the population (as of 2000) speaks Italian (88.3%), with German being second most common (7.1%) and French being third (2.0%). Of the Swiss national languages (as of 2000), 74 speak German, 21 people speak French, 923 people speak Italian, and 1 person speaks Romansh. The remainder (26 people) speak another language.

As of 2008, the gender distribution of the population was 49.2% male and 50.8% female. The population was made up of 485 Swiss men (38.4% of the population), and 136 (10.8%) non-Swiss men. There were 543 Swiss women (43.0%), and 99 (7.8%) non-Swiss women.

In 2008 there were 10 live births to Swiss citizens and 3 births to non-Swiss citizens, and in same time span there were 6 deaths of Swiss citizens and 1 non-Swiss citizen death. Ignoring immigration and emigration, the population of Swiss citizens increased by 4 while the foreign population increased by 2. There were 2 Swiss men and 3 Swiss women who emigrated from Switzerland. At the same time, there were 8 non-Swiss men and 2 non-Swiss women who immigrated from another country to Switzerland. The total Swiss population change in 2008 (from all sources, including moves across municipal borders) was an increase of 31 and the non-Swiss population change was an increase of 41 people. This represents a population growth rate of 6.2%.

The age distribution, as of 2009, in Manno is; 133 children or 10.5% of the population are between 0 and 9 years old and 124 teenagers or 9.8% are between 10 and 19. Of the adult population, 120 people or 9.5% of the population are between 20 and 29 years old. 228 people or 18.1% are between 30 and 39, 218 people or 17.3% are between 40 and 49, and 145 people or 11.5% are between 50 and 59. The senior population distribution is 157 people or 12.4% of the population are between 60 and 69 years old, 96 people or 7.6% are between 70 and 79, there are 42 people or 3.3% who are over 80.

As of 2000, there were 414 private households in the municipality, and an average of 2.5 persons per household. In 2000 there were 223 single family homes (or 77.2% of the total) out of a total of 289 inhabited buildings. There were 42 two family buildings (14.5%) and 16 multi-family buildings (5.5%). There were also 8 buildings in the municipality that were multipurpose buildings (used for both housing and commercial or another purpose).

The vacancy rate for the municipality, in 2008, was 3.43%. In 2000 there were 442 apartments in the municipality. The most common apartment size was the 5 room apartment of which there were 135. There were 10 single room apartments and 135 apartments with five or more rooms. Of these apartments, a total of 414 apartments (93.7% of the total) were permanently occupied, while 19 apartments (4.3%) were seasonally occupied and 9 apartments (2.0%) were empty. As of 2007, the construction rate of new housing units was 6 new units per 1000 residents.

The historical population is given in the following chart:

== Politics ==
In the 2007 federal election the most popular party was the CVP which received 28.67% of the vote. The next three most popular parties were the FDP (23.55%), the Ticino League (18.95%) and the SP (12.45%). In the federal election, a total of 413 votes were cast, and the voter turnout was 51.9%.

In the 2007 Gran Consiglio election, there were a total of 785 registered voters in Manno, of which 523 or 66.6% voted. 12 blank ballots and 2 null ballots were cast, leaving 509 valid ballots in the election. The most popular party was the PPD+GenGiova which received 114 or 22.4% of the vote. The next three most popular parties were; the SSI (with 104 or 20.4%), the PLRT (with 99 or 19.4%) and the LEGA (with 86 or 16.9%).

In the 2007 Consiglio di Stato election, 4 blank ballots and 2 null ballots were cast, leaving 517 valid ballots in the election. The most popular party was the LEGA which received 137 or 26.5% of the vote. The next three most popular parties were; the PPD (with 110 or 21.3%), the SSI (with 92 or 17.8%) and the PLRT (with 87 or 16.8%).

== Economy ==
Manno hosts Marconi Technologies, Edizioniie Musicali e Discografiche and the new UBS Centre of Competence for Artificial Intelligence, Analysis and Innovation.

As of 2007, Manno had an unemployment rate of 2.8%. As of 2005, there were 15 people employed in the primary economic sector and about 3 businesses involved in this sector. 659 people were employed in the secondary sector and there were 46 businesses in this sector. 2,371 people were employed in the tertiary sector, with 209 businesses in this sector. There were 526 residents of the municipality who were employed in some capacity, of which females made up 38.8% of the workforce.

In 2000, there were 3,405 workers who commuted into the municipality and 386 workers who commuted away. The municipality is a net importer of workers, with about 8.8 workers entering the municipality for every one leaving. About 14.2% of the workforce coming into Manno are coming from outside Switzerland. Of the working population, 11.2% used public transportation to get to work, and 70% used a private car.

== Religion ==
From the 2000 census, 854 or 81.7% were Roman Catholic, while 62 or 5.9% belonged to the Swiss Reformed Church. There are 109 individuals (or about 10.43% of the population) who belong to another church (not listed on the census), and 20 individuals (or about 1.91% of the population) did not answer the question.

== Education ==
The entire Swiss population is generally well educated. In Manno about 76.2% of the population (between age 25-64) have completed either non-mandatory upper secondary education or additional higher education (either university or a Fachhochschule).

In Manno there were a total of 206 students (as of 2009). The Ticino education system provides up to three years of non-mandatory kindergarten and in Manno there were 38 children in kindergarten. The primary school program lasts for five years and includes both a standard school and a special school. In the municipality, 71 students attended the standard primary schools and 1 student attended the special school. In the lower secondary school system, students either attend a two-year middle school followed by a two-year pre-apprenticeship or they attend a four-year program to prepare for higher education. There were 43 students in the two-year middle school, while 18 students were in the four-year advanced program.

The upper secondary school includes several options, but at the end of the upper secondary program, a student will be prepared to enter a trade or to continue on to a university or college. In Ticino, vocational students may either attend school while working on their internship or apprenticeship (which takes three or four years) or may attend school followed by an internship or apprenticeship (which takes one year as a full-time student or one and a half to two years as a part-time student). There were 17 vocational students who were attending school full-time and 17 who attend part-time.

The professional program lasts three years and prepares a student for a job in engineering, nursing, computer science, business, tourism and similar fields. There was 1 student in the professional program.

As of 2000, there were 359 students in Manno who came from another municipality, while 89 residents attended schools outside the municipality.

=== Scientific research ===
The Swiss National Supercomputing Centre (Centro Nazionale Svizzero di Supercomputing) is based in Manno and houses some of the most powerful supercomputers in Switzerland.

== Notable people ==
- Silvan Zingg (born 1973) a Swiss boogie woogie, blues, and jazz pianist and, in 2002, the founder of the International Boogie Woogie festival in Lugano
