= Bruno Reichlin =

Swiss architect (born 1941)

Bruno Reichlin (born 10 February 1941 in Lucerne) is a Swiss architect.

== Biography ==
Reichlin studied at the Polytechnic of Zürich.

In the 1970s, he became associated with Fabio Reinhart and opened a practice in Lugano. They were strongly influenced by Italian architect Aldo Rossi.

Reichlin became a professor of architecture at the University of Geneva in 1984.
