= Vedeggio =

River in Switzerland

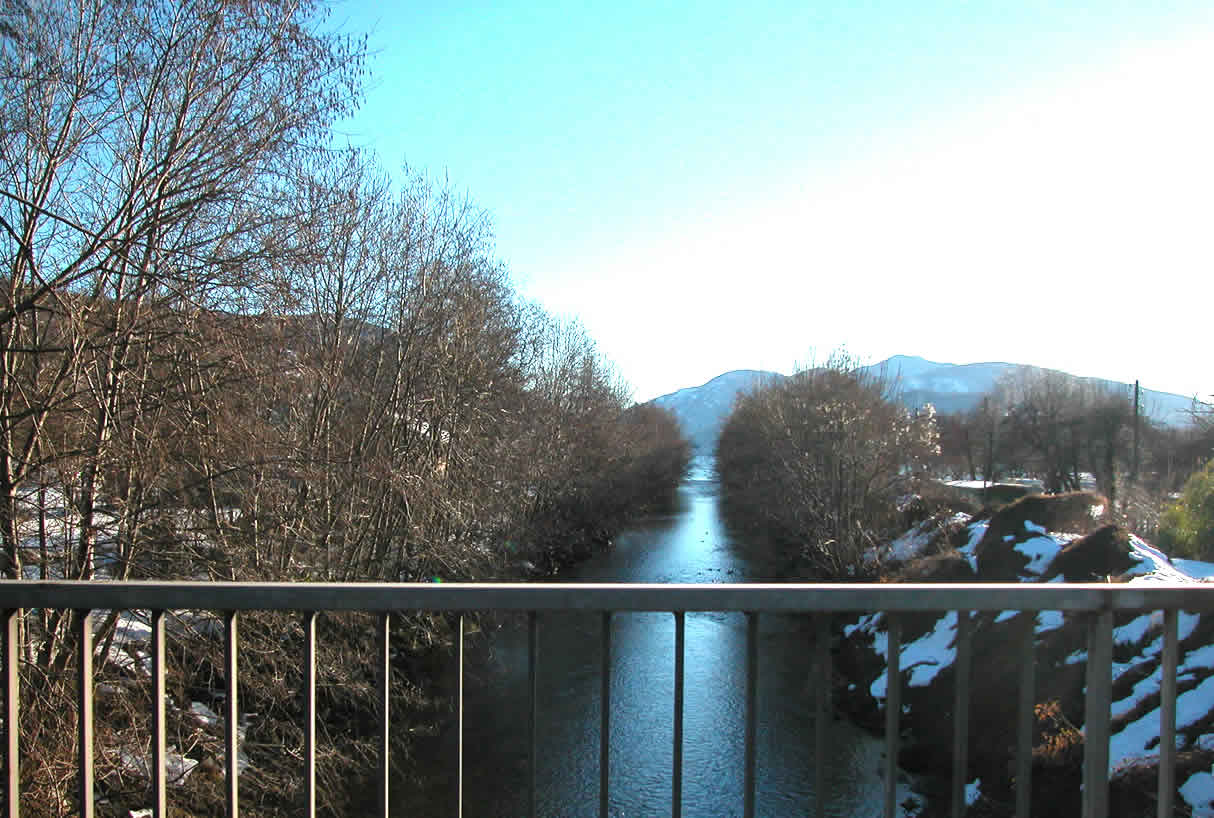

Location
- Country: Switzerland

Physical characteristics
- Source
  - location: Monte Camoghè, Canton Ticino
  - elevation: 2,200 m (7,200 ft)
- Mouth
  - location: Lago di Lugano at Agno
  - coordinates: 45.9949°N 8.9074°E

Basin features
- Progression: Lake Lugano→ Tresa→ Lake Maggiore→ Ticino→ Po→ Adriatic Sea

The Vedeggio is a river of the Swiss Canton Ticino which rises on the slopes of Monte Camoghè (2200m) between Bellinzona and Lugano, crosses the plain of Vedeggio (which takes its name from the river), and enters Lake Lugano at Agno. Its final section, from the outskirts of Agno until its emission into Lake Lugano has been cut into a straight channel for ease of civil planning in the area. The river is receiver of the Lugano-Bioggio sewage treatment plant.
