= Monte Ceneri (disambiguation) =

Monte Ceneri is a mountain pass in Switzerland.

It may also refer to:

- Monte Ceneri Rail Tunnel, below Monte Ceneri
- Monte Ceneri Road Tunnel, below Monte Ceneri
- Ceneri Base Tunnel, below Monte Ceneri
- Monte Ceneri transmitter, on Monte Ceneri
- Monteceneri, a municipality encompassing Monte Ceneri
