= Monte Ceneri Tunnel =

The Monte Ceneri Tunnel may refer to:

- The Monte Ceneri Rail Tunnel, a rail tunnel under the Monte Ceneri Pass in the Swiss canton of Ticino and comprising two bores:
  - The Monte Ceneri I Tunnel
  - The Monte Ceneri II Tunnel
- The Monte Ceneri Road Tunnel, a motorway tunnel under the Monte Ceneri Pass in the Swiss canton of Ticino

== See also ==
- The Ceneri Base Tunnel, a rail tunnel under construction at a lower level under the Monte Ceneri Pass in the Swiss canton of Ticino
