= Gotthard railway =

Key central Swiss transport link

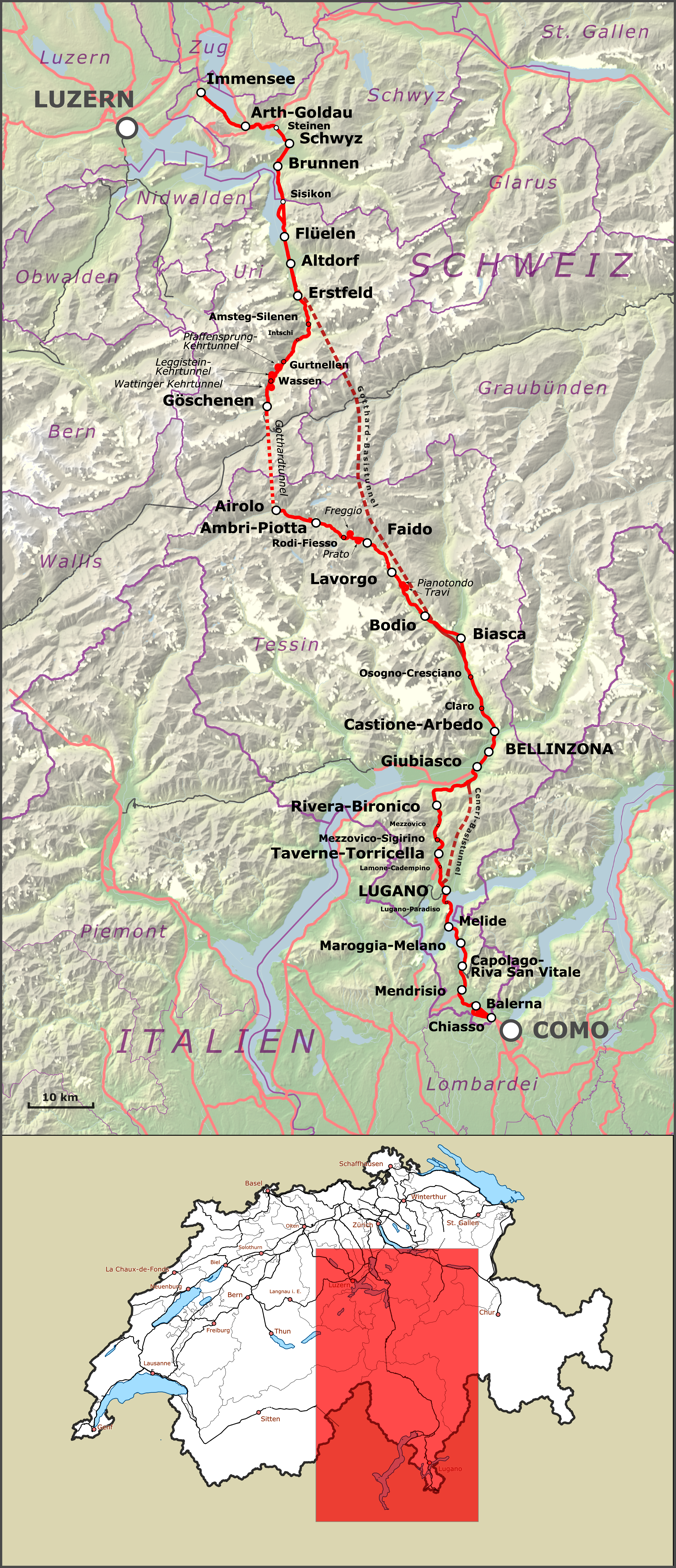
- Map of the Gotthard railway

Overview
- Status: hourly, each day
- Owner: Swiss Federal Railways
- Locale: Switzerland
- Termini: Immensee, Schwyz; Chiasso, Ticino

History
- Opened: 1 June 1882

Technical
- Line length: 216 km (134 mi) (Immensee-Chiasso)
- Track gauge: 1,435 mm (4 ft 8 1/2 in) standard gauge
- Electrification: 15 kV 16.7 Hz AC supplied by overhead line (1922)
- Highest elevation: 1,151 m (3,776 ft)
- Maximum incline: 27 ‰

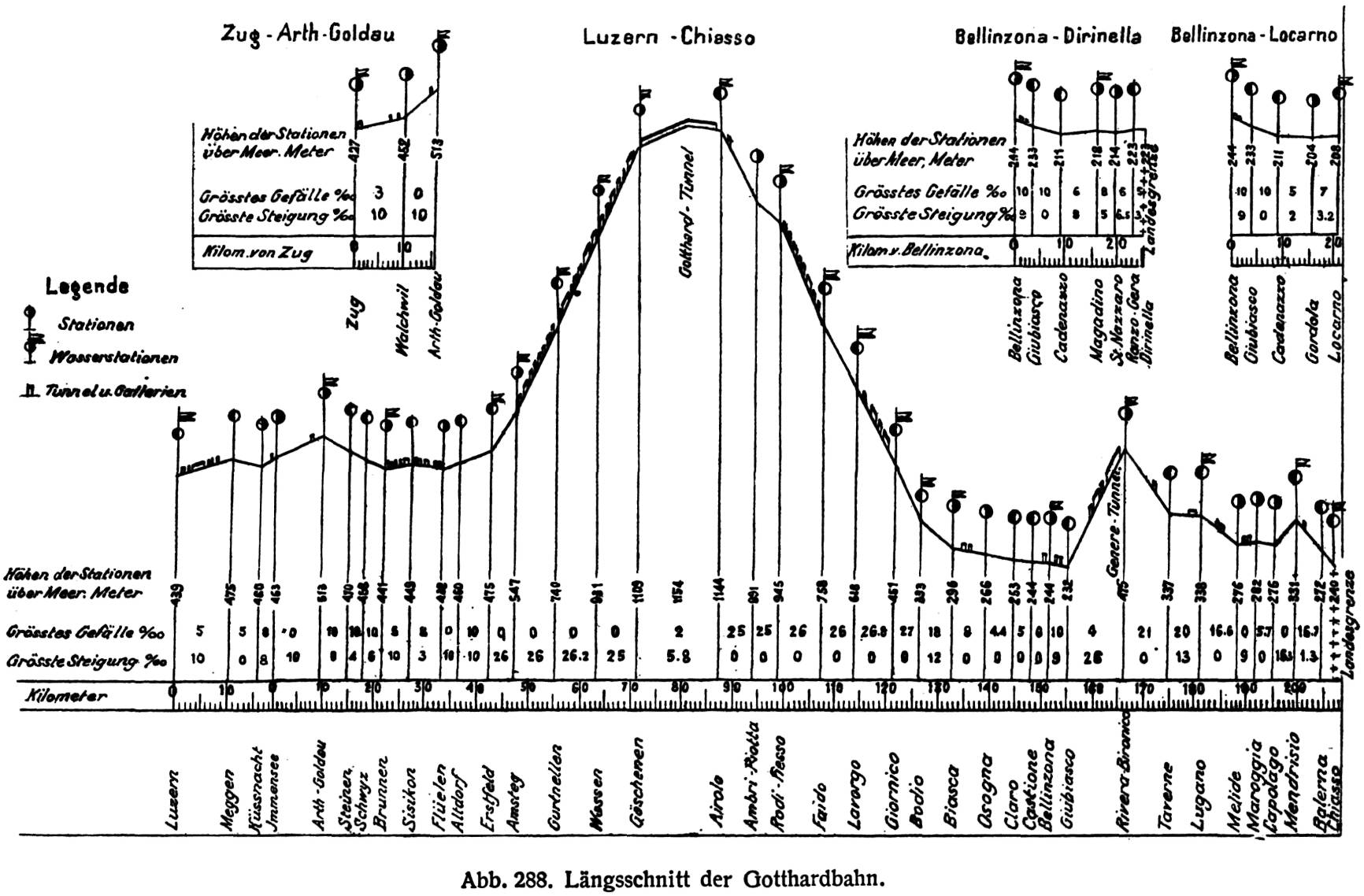
Longitudinal profile of Gotthardbahn incl. branchlines

The Gotthard railway (German: Gotthardbahn; Italian: Ferrovia del Gottardo) is the Swiss trans-alpine railway line from northern Switzerland to the canton of Ticino. It is named for the Saint-Gotthard Massif, through which it passes. The line forms a major part of an important international railway link between northern and southern Europe, especially on the Rotterdam-Basel-Genoa corridor. Construction was financed by the Gotthard Railway Company (German: Gotthardbahn-Gesellschaft at Lucerne).

The railway comprises an international main line through Switzerland from Basel or Zürich to Immensee to Chiasso, together with branches, from Immensee to Lucerne and Rotkreuz, from Arth-Goldau to Zug or Pfäffikon SZ, and from Bellinzona to Chiasso via Locarno and Luino. At Chiasso, the line connects to the Milan–Chiasso railway, which runs across the Swiss–Italian border. The main line, the second-highest standard railway in Switzerland, penetrates the Alps using the Gotthard Tunnel at 1,151 metres (3,776 ft) above sea level. The line then descends as far as Bellinzona, at 241 metres (791 ft) above sea level, before climbing again to the pass of Monte Ceneri, on the way to Lugano and Chiasso. The extreme differences in altitude necessitate the use of long ramped approaches on each side, together with seven spirals.

Construction of the line started in 1872, with some lowland sections opening by 1875. The full line opened in 1882, following the completion of the Gotthard Tunnel. The line was incorporated into the Swiss Federal Railways in 1909 and electrified in 1922. The line has 36 tunnels totaling 31,216 meters.

The approaches to the existing tunnel continue to restrict speed and capacity on this important international route. In 1992 it was decided to build a new lower-level route on the Gotthard axis as part of the NRLA project. This route involved the construction of the new Gotthard Base Tunnel and Ceneri Base Tunnel. The Gotthard Base Tunnel was completed and integrated into the existing route in 2016, while the Ceneri Base Tunnel opened in 2020.

== History ==
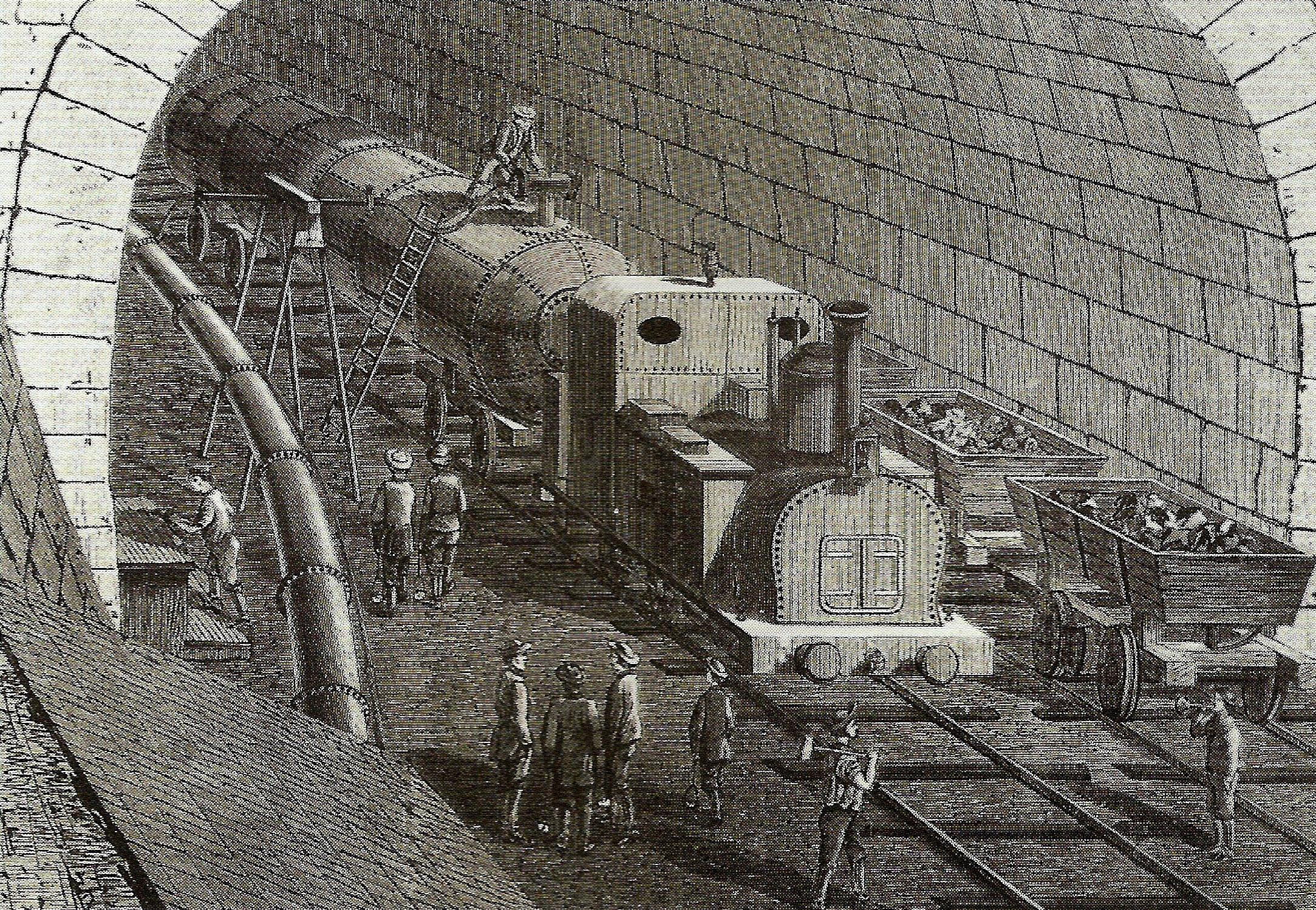
Contemporary drawing showing a construction locomotive

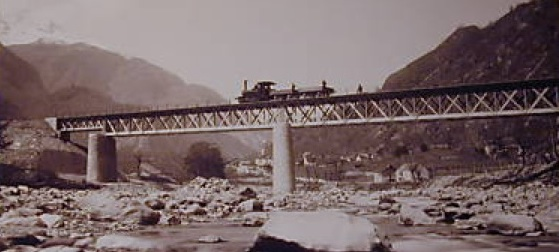
Lower Ticino Bridge during construction phase, with its original single beam truss structure

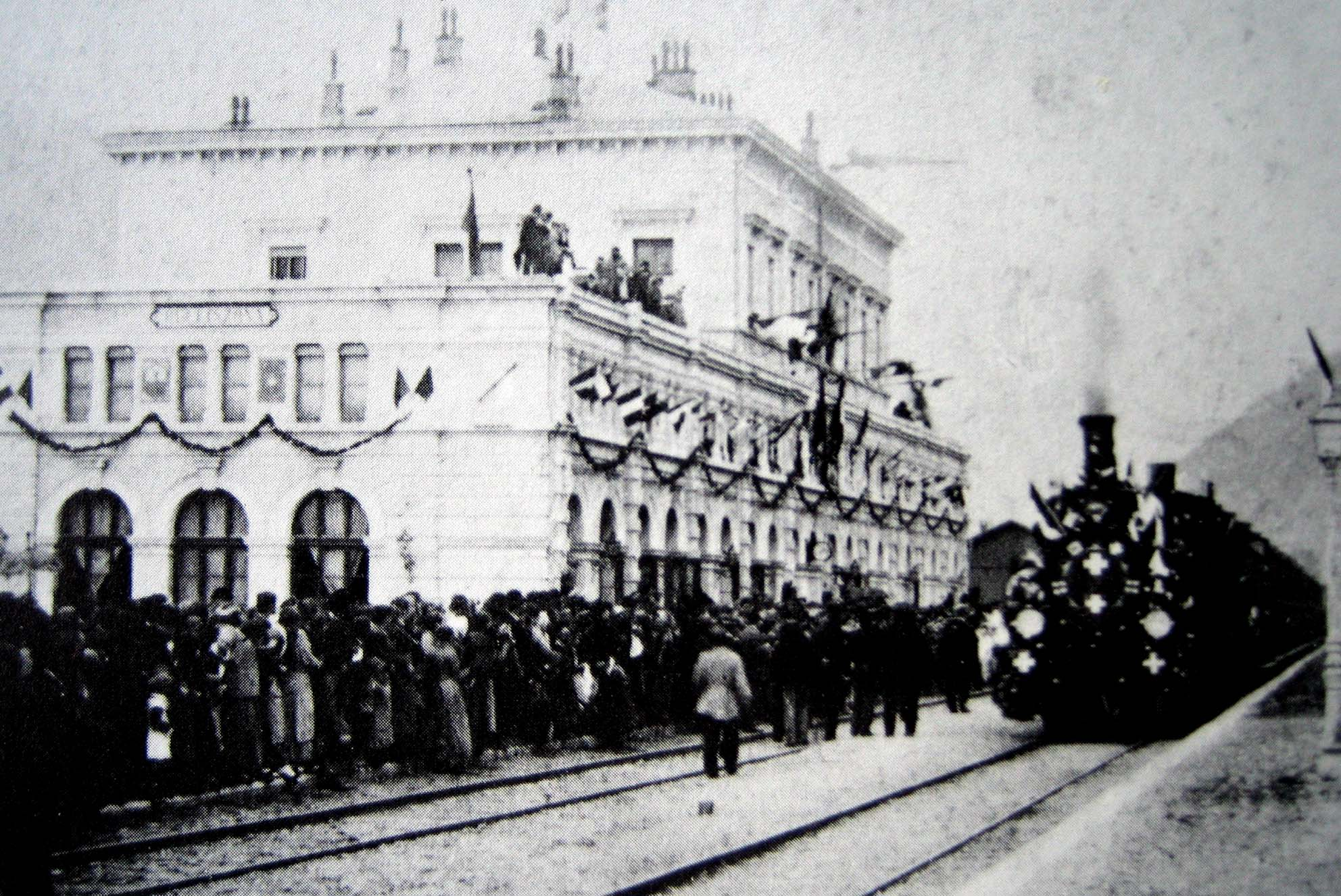
Opening celebrations at Bellinzona

=== Conception ===
By the early 1870s, northern Switzerland had a significant network of railways, with links to the adjoining railways of Germany and France. To the west, a line had reached Brig, in the upper Rhone valley, from Lausanne. In the central north, lines linked Olten, Lucerne, Zug and Zürich. However, no line had yet reached through the Alps to southern Switzerland or the border with Italy. All north-to-south rail traffic had to pass either to the west or east of Switzerland through the Mont-Cenis, Semmering or Brenner railways.

A north-south route through Switzerland had been discussed as far back as 1848. An international conference in Bern in 1869 had decided that the best route would be via the valleys of the rivers Reuss and Ticino, linked by a tunnel under the Gotthard Pass. The selected route was an ancient one that pilgrims and traders had used since at least the 13th century.

Treaties for the construction of the line were signed with the Kingdom of Italy, in 1869, and the German Empire, in 1871. The Gotthard Railway Company was incorporated in Lucerne in 1871. To the overall costs of CHF 238 million (in 1869/71) the Italian government eventually contributed CHF 58 million (£2.25 million), with Germany contributing CHF 30 million (£1.25 million).

=== Construction and opening ===
Construction of the Gotthard railway started in 1872, and the first lowland sections from Biasca to Locarno and Lugano to Chiasso were opened by 1874.

The whole line was inaugurated with festivities in Lucerne and Chiasso from 21 May to 25 May 1882. Scheduled operations started on 1 June. At the time, the 15,003-metre-long (49,222 ft) Gotthard Rail Tunnel was the world's longest rail tunnel (seconded by the Simplon Tunnel in 1906). Soon after construction, the army secured the line with fortresses (for instance, above Airolo, and at Biasca) and ways to block the tunnel in case of an invasion (among others, an artificial landslide to block the southern tunnel entrance).

At the same time, the Aargauische Südbahn completed the section from Rotkreuz to Immensee, which provided a rail link from Aarau. The additional feeder lines from Lucerne to Immensee, and from Zug to Arth-Goldau were completed in 1887.

Gotthard railway double track
Segment	Opening double track
Immensee — Brunnen	01.05.1904
Brunnen — Sisikon	15.09.1947
Sisikon — Flüelen	01.03.1943
Flüelen — Altdorf	15.01.1896
Altdorf — Erstfeld	06.12.1896
Erstfeld — Silenen Amsteg	09.04.1893
Silenen Amsteg — Gurtnellen	14.05.1893
Gurtnellen — Wassen	26.06.1892
Wassen — Göschenen	28.05.1893
Göschenen — Airolo	01.06.1883
Airolo — Ambri Piotta	02.09.1890
Ambri Piotta — Rodi Fiesso	31.07.1890
Rodi Fiesso — Faido	28.05.1890
Faido — Lavorgo	13.09.1891
Lavorgo — Giornico	27.03.1892
Giornico — Bodio	01.05.1892
Bodio — Biasca	15.05.1892
Biasca — Osogna	31.05.1896
Osognia — Bellinzona	19.04.1896
Bellinzona — Giubiasco	01.06.1883
Giubiasco — Al Sasso	20.12.1922
Al Sasso — Rivera Bironico	21.01.1934
Rivera Bironico — Mezzovico	27.03.1942
Mezzovico — Taverne Torricella	02.05.1946
Taverne Torricella — Lugano	30.04.1942
Lugano — Melide	10.10.1915
Melide — Bissone	02.04.1965
Bissone — Maroggia Melano	03.06.1956
Maroggia Melano — Mendrisio	01.10.1913
Mendrisio — Chiasso	01.05.1912

=== Electrification ===
In 1922, the whole line was electrified by Brown, Boveri & Cie with 15 kV 16.7 Hz AC supplied by overhead line.

== Early railway operations ==
=== The Gotthard railway timetable from 1899 ===
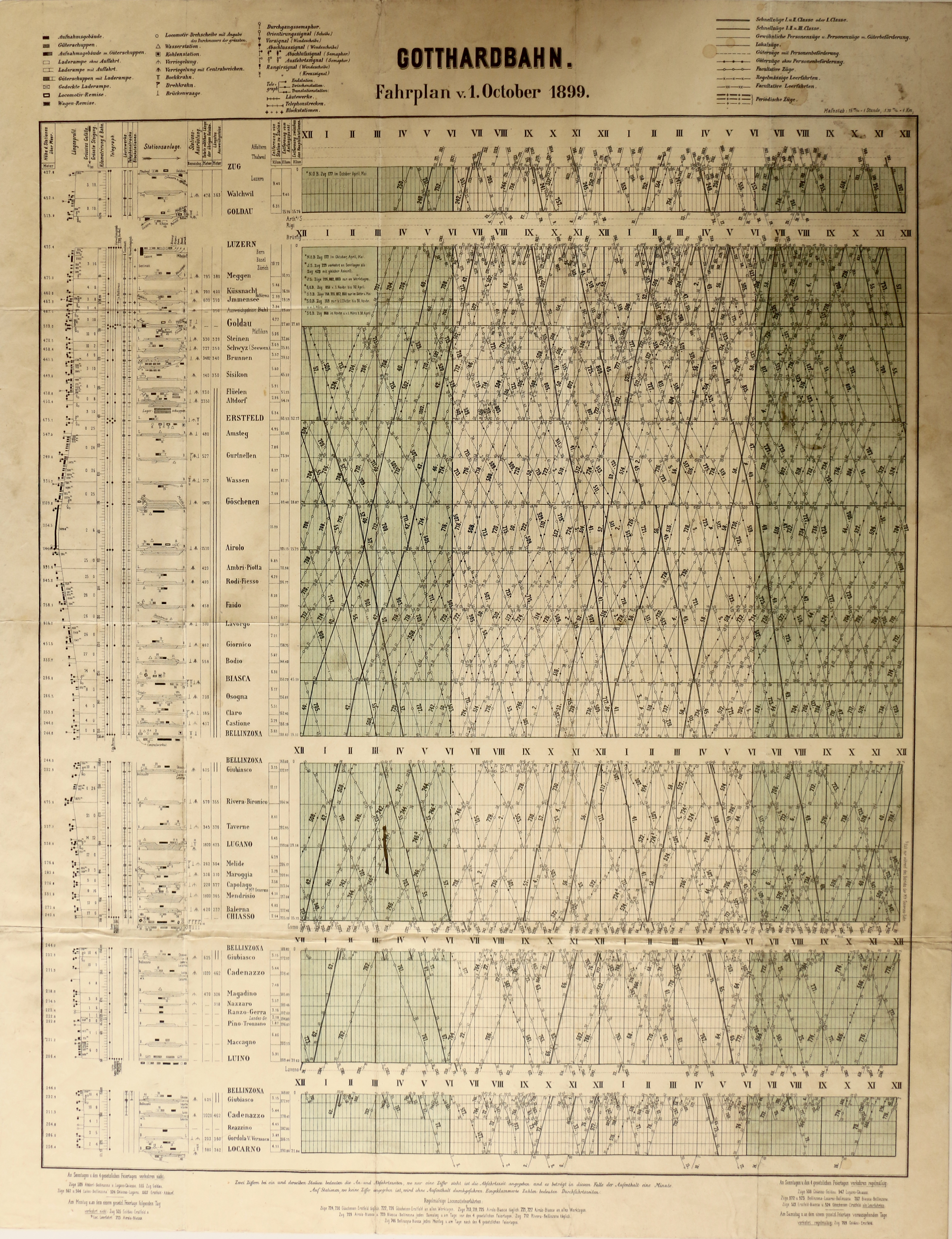
Timetable of the Gotthard railway from 1899

The Gotthard railway graphic timetable contains a great variety of information with regard to material and especially operational aspects in the year 1899, 17 years after the inauguration of the Gotthard tunnel and completion of the railway. The map key and captions to each column are to be found at the top of the page. From left to right information is given on the location of each station's elevation in relation to sea level, the longitudinal profile, signal lights, tunnels and their length, for each route section on southbound journeys the greatest gradient, distances, employed telegraphs and their networking, signal bells and their connection, telephones, block stations, track layout of the respective station and their equipment, total usable length of the remaining tracks, the longest side track, station names and distances between them, distance to point of origin and between main stations. Departure and arrival times are displayed within the graphic timetable.

Information can be drawn as to the tunnel's apex which lies at 1,154.5 meters (3,788 ft) above sea level and the fact that the tunnel does not run in a straight line but rather in a slope down from either side of its apex. The tunnel was designed in such a way that inflowing water would be able to drain. From the railway station of Göschenen to the tunnel's apex the train lines ascend at an angle of 6‰ and descend at 2‰ from the apex to the village of Airolo. The tunnel's length is indicated to be 14,998 metres (49,206 ft), its apex being at kilometre 80. The old Gotthard railway's distances were measured from the town of Immensee, as clearly indicated on the graphic timetable.

Electrical telegraphs and signal bells are listed to the right of the distance column, and a detailed description thereof is to be found in the sections The Gotthard railway Telegraph Network and The Gotthard railway Signal Bells.

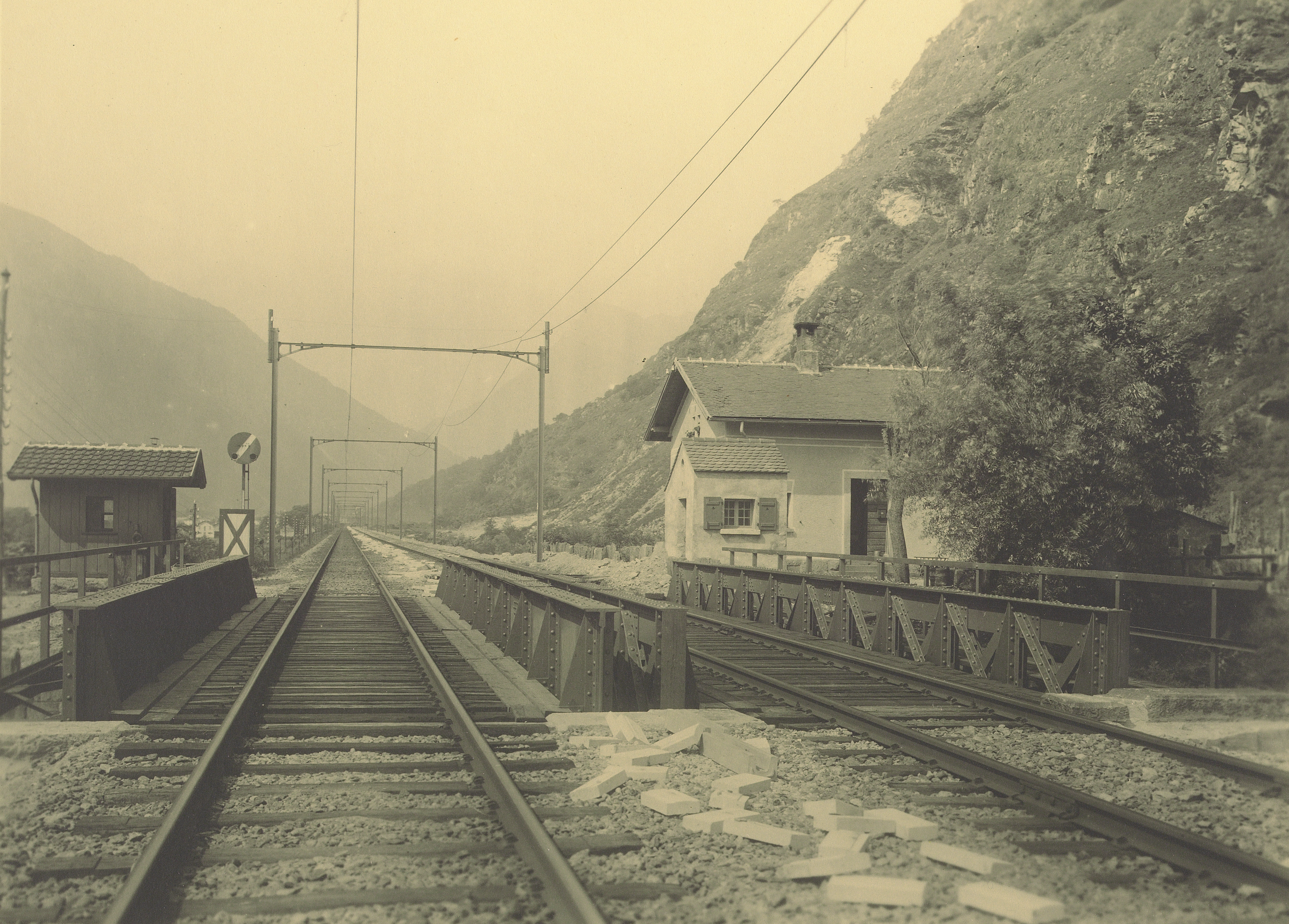
Watchman's house at Mondascia bridge near Biasca 46°20′25.6″N 008°58′40.9″E

The track layout of each station shows that in 1899 the Gotthard railway ran on double-tracks from the villages of Flüelen to Giubiasco. Facing north the picture on the right shows the watchman's house at the Mondascia bridge depicts the double tracks and advance signal to the entry signal before Biasca (at 132.5 kilometres (82.3 mi)), mentioned in the timetable. The next picture on the right shows the Pianotondo viaduct and the Pianotondo spiral tunnel's upper gate with its watchman's house, which came into use during the days of the double-track steam service, roughly at the time of the graphic timetable's validity.

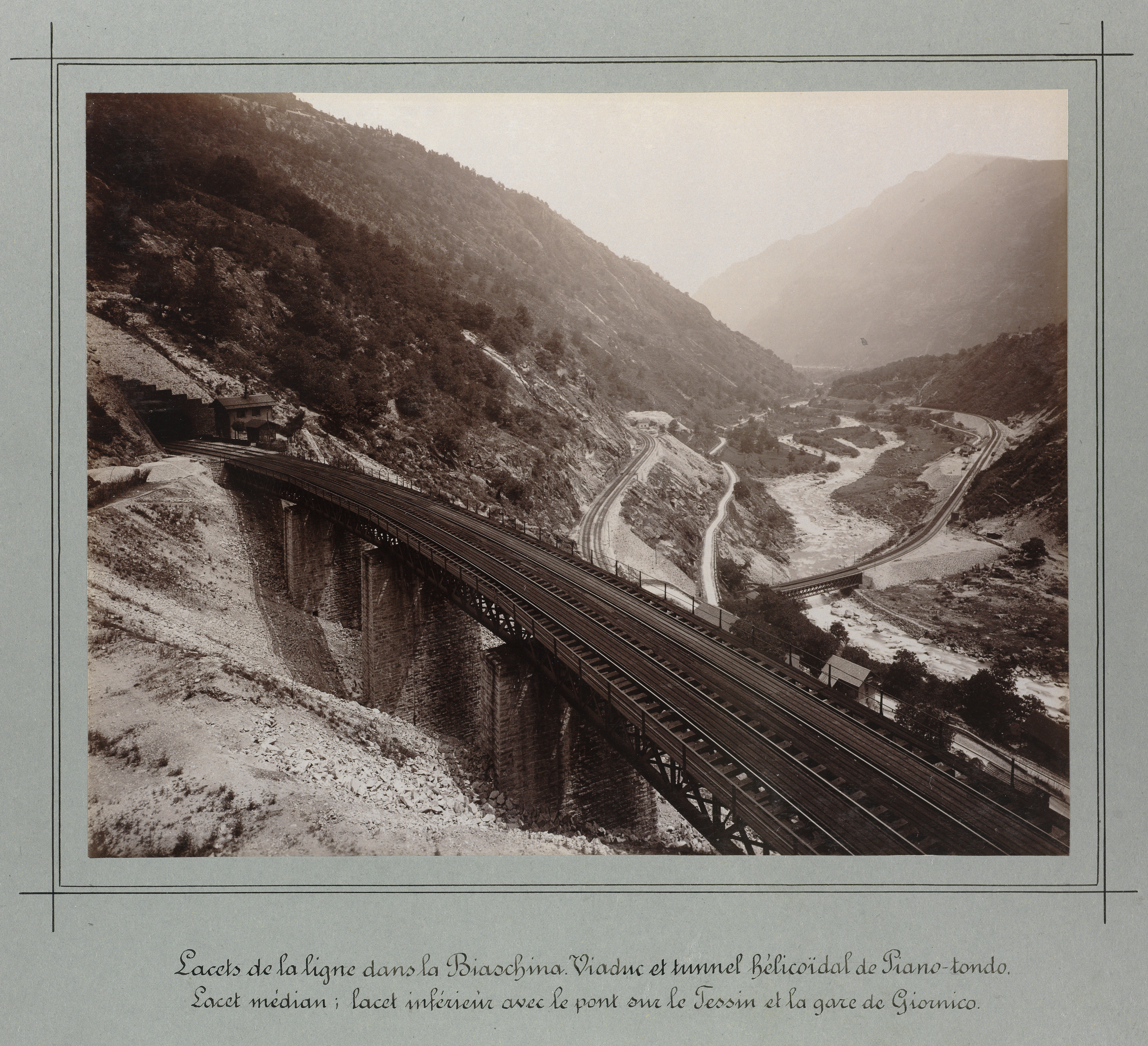
Pianotono-spiral tunnel 46°25′22″N 008°51′32″E

The graphic timetable shows two tracks running southwards from Giubiasco. One is signposted "Chiasso", the other "Luino/Locarno". From this point onwards the railway runs on single tracks. Giubiasco's neighbouring stations to the south, Rivera-Bironico and Cadenazzo, are all on single tracks. At each underpass on the Ceneri section it is clearly visible to this day that these were built at greatly different points in time. The Giubiasco-Al Sasso and Al Sasso-Rivera sections were equipped with double tracks in 1922 and 1934 respectively.

The graphic timetable is a two-dimensional image of the train journeys. Time is displayed horizontally from midnight XII o'clock to midnight XII o'clock. The stations along the journey, from Zug and Lucerne to Chiasso, Locarno and Luino are displayed vertically. The first scheduled train, an express train with first-, second- and third-class carriages, leaves Bellinzona at 03:17. Train number 55 is powered by a steam locomotive and, according to the timetable, does not make a scheduled stop at Giubiasco, Rivera-Bironico and Taverne. Arrival at Lugano is scheduled at 04:09, from where it leaves again at 04:14. In 1899 the entire train journey from Bellinzona to Lugano was scheduled to be 52 minutes. Today (2017), the same journey on one of the EuroCity trains takes 27 minutes. The illustrations show that between Giubiasco and Rivera Bironico trains do not pass each other as in 1899 this was, as mentioned above, a single-track line. This information can thus be drawn from both the stations' track layout and the graphic timetable. Also visible on the graphic timetable is the fact that between Osogna and Biasca, trains do however pass each other along their journeys, being a double-track line. Further, the Arth-Rigi-Bahn's trains (nowadays Rigi Railways), are also listed in the Gotthard railways' timetable. The timetable's scale is 15 mm/hour horizontally and 1.75 mm/km vertically.

=== The Gotthard railway telegraph network ===
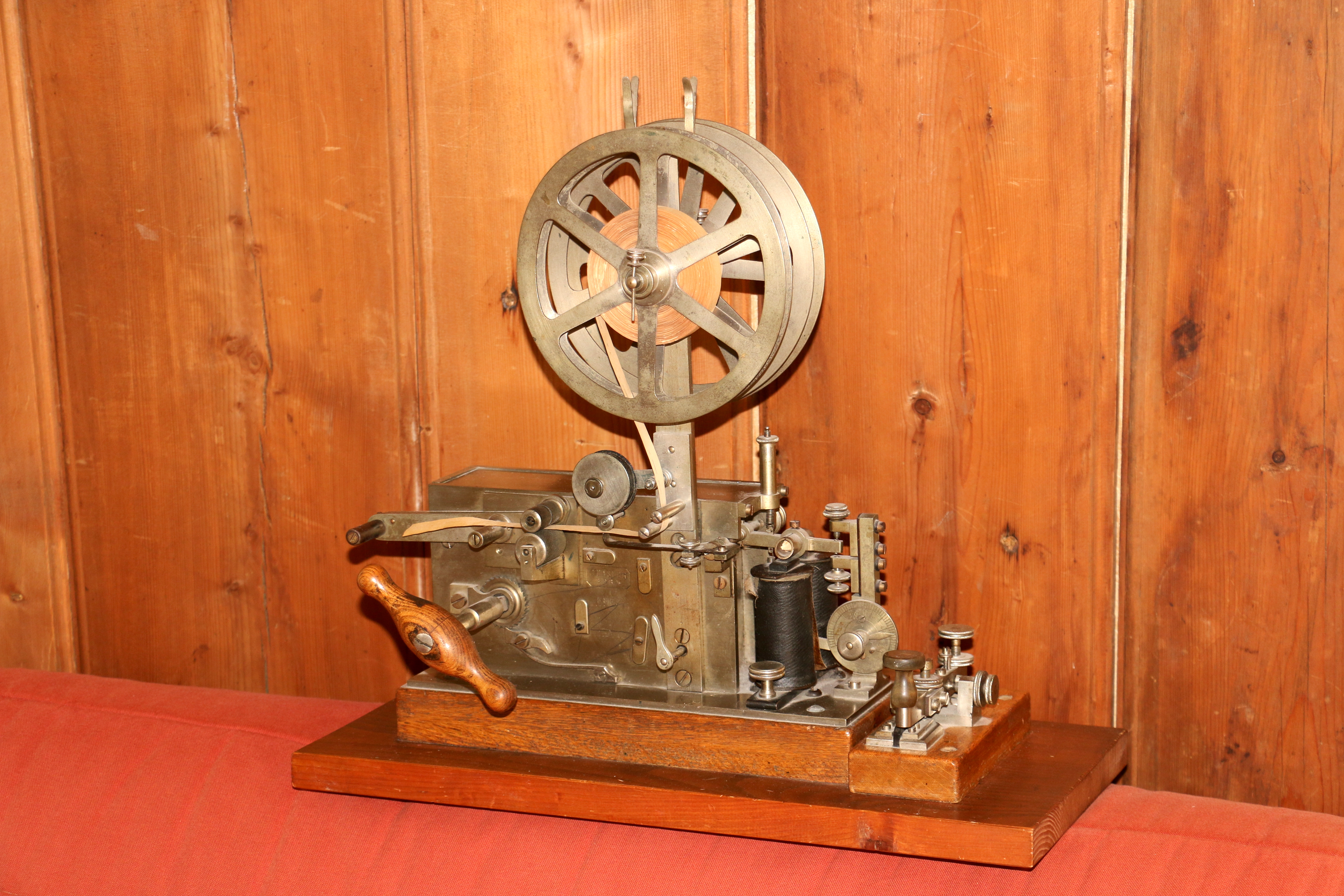
An electrical telegraph of the Gotthard railway

To coordinate trains, the Gotthard railway used a telegraph network, which linked up all railway stations on the entire line from Lucerne to Chiasso, Locarno and Luino. This network is pointed out on the left-hand side of the graphic timetable. The telegraphs for every railway station shown on the timetable are marked with a black dot. As a detailed section from the timetable shows, the Biasca station used four telegraphs at that time. One of those telegraphs linked all stations from Biasca to Bellinzona. Whatever message was tapped out on this telegraph (sent by Morse code), was transmitted to all stations up to Bellinzona. A second telegraph linked all stations from Biasca to Göschenen. What was tapped out on the third telegraph, reached only Bellinzona, Faido, Airolo, Göschenen, Wassen and Erstfeld. The fourth telegraph was for long distances. Messages transmitted from there reached Bellinzona, Airolo, Erstfeld, Goldau and Lucerne. The telegraphs with their Morse keys and the telegraph relays were produced by Gustav Hasler (Bern).

=== The Gotthard railway signal bells ===
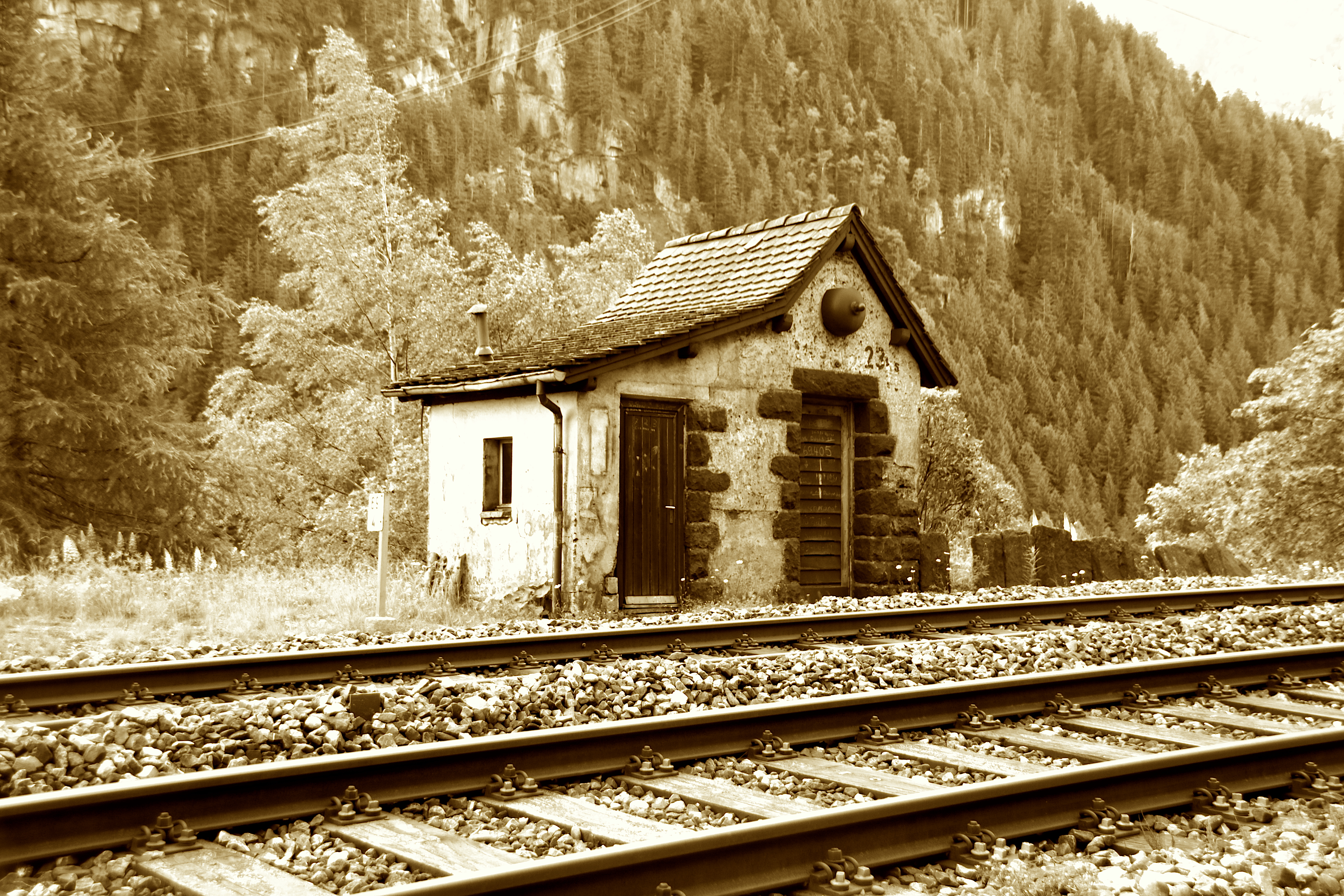
Signal bell at Gotthardbahn north of Göschenen 46°40′29.3″N 008°35′31.7″E

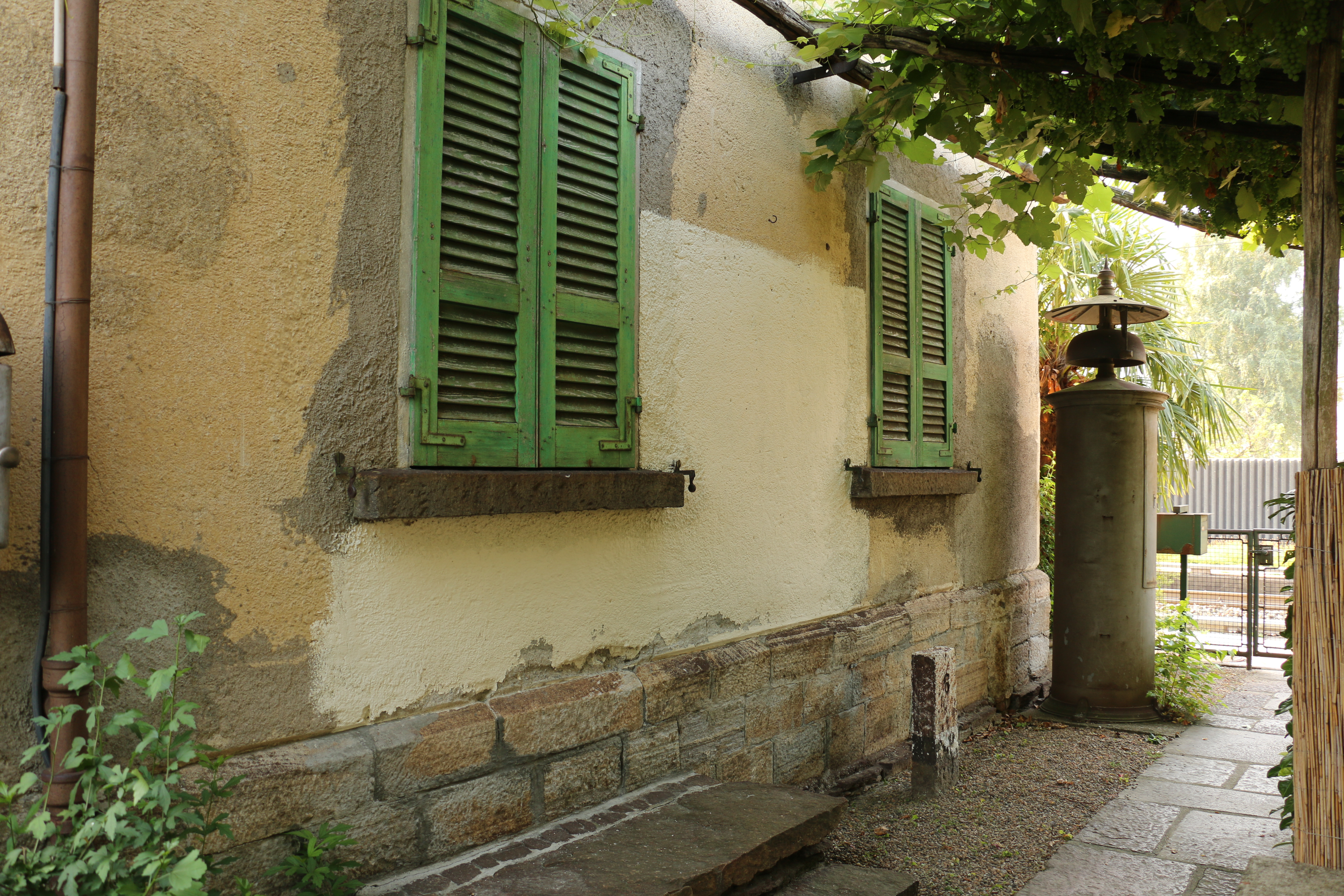
Gotthard railway signal bell at Sant'Antonino 46°09′38.8″N 008°58′27.3″E

The Gotthard railway employed signal bells within its stations and along the line to signal any approaching train. An alarm was triggered once a train had left a neighbouring station or block station. These signal bells were partly installed along the line and signalled any construction worker of an approaching train. In addition, any railway watchman's house and railroad crossing would be equipped with a signal bell. Southbound trains were signalled by three triple chimes, northbound trains by two double chimes. The signalling mechanism at each signal bell had to be manually wound up every day by station employees and railway watchmen. Part of the mechanism was a weight having to be raised by help of a pulley. The electric signal triggering the alarm operated a relay, activating the bell's hammer through force of the aforementioned weight. Each signal bell within the Gotthard railway's network is marked on the graphic timetable. The railway watchman's house number 159 (Casello 159) signal bell on the Monte Ceneri line between Giubiasco and Rivera-Bironico is shown as an example in the timetable excerpt. A southbound train departing Giubiasco for Rivera-Bironico would trigger alarms at eleven different signal bells on its 11-kilometre-long (6.8 mi) journey. Around 1980 these signal bells were decommissioned.

=== Track maintenance and safety ===
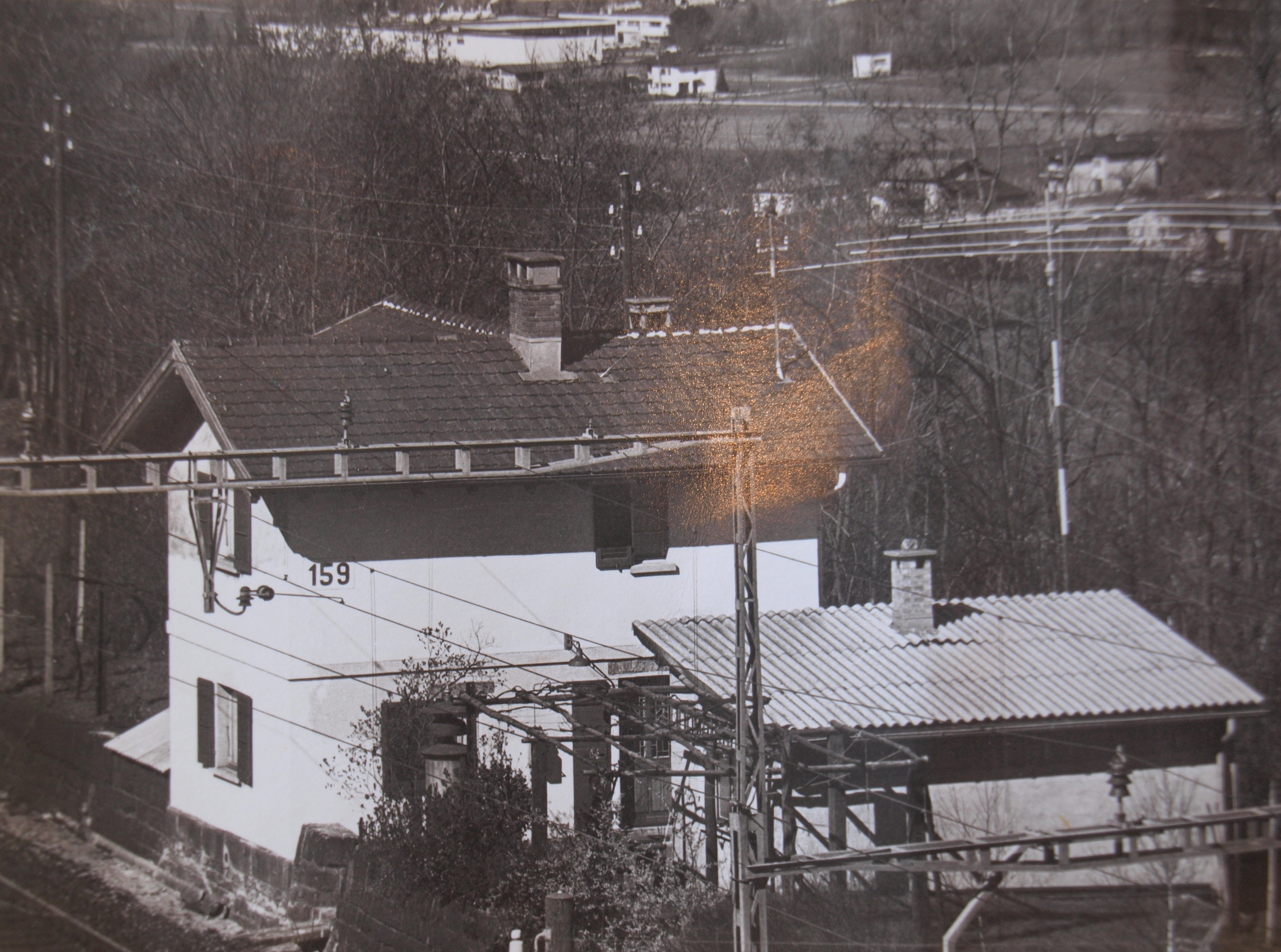
Watchman's house Casello 159 46°09′21.2″N 008°59′24.7″E

In the Gotthard railway's early days ultrasound was not available to examine the tracks. Fractures within these were far more common than today, when special ultrasound-equipped rail inspection trains are employed in the maintenance process. The railway watchman was especially important in ensuring the Gotthard railway's safe operation. A railway watchman was assigned to a special segment of tracks which he had to inspect every day. Fractures, deformations and the tracks' general condition were to be reported to the track master. Tending to loose screws and cutting down shrubs were also part of the watchman's job description. Also putting out small shrub fires, caused by the heavily employed brakes of downhill running cargo trains, were part of his duty. The railway watchman was equipped with a red flag to be able to stop trains in an emergency. The Gotthard railway's watchmen lived in specially provided watchman's houses along the line. In Italian these watchman's houses are called Casello. Every day they had to inspect the tracks up to the next watchman's segment. The watchman's houses were built along the entire Gotthard line with distances of up to 4 kilometres (2.5 mi) between them and they were all numbered. From 1950 onward the track did not require as many inspections as before. Between Giubiasco and Rivera the railway watchmen then only had to perform such an inspection every other day. Their former watchman houses were now unstaffed and subsequently used as holiday homes or private dwellings. From 1995 onward the Swiss Federal Railways turned to selling these watchman's houses.

== Swiss Federal Railways ==
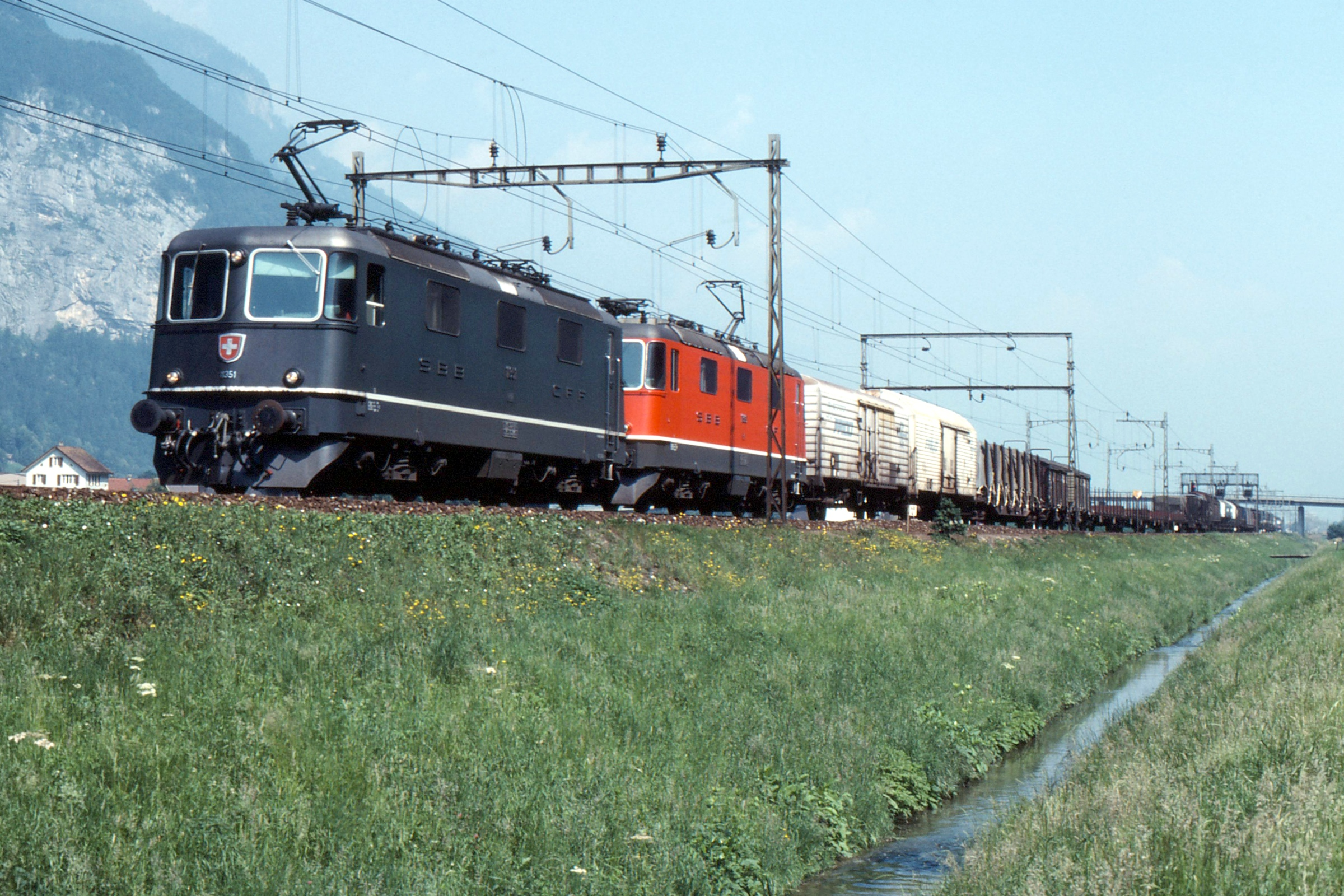
A 1984 photograph, showing the original overhead electrification gantries, along with a pair of Re 4 4 III locomotives

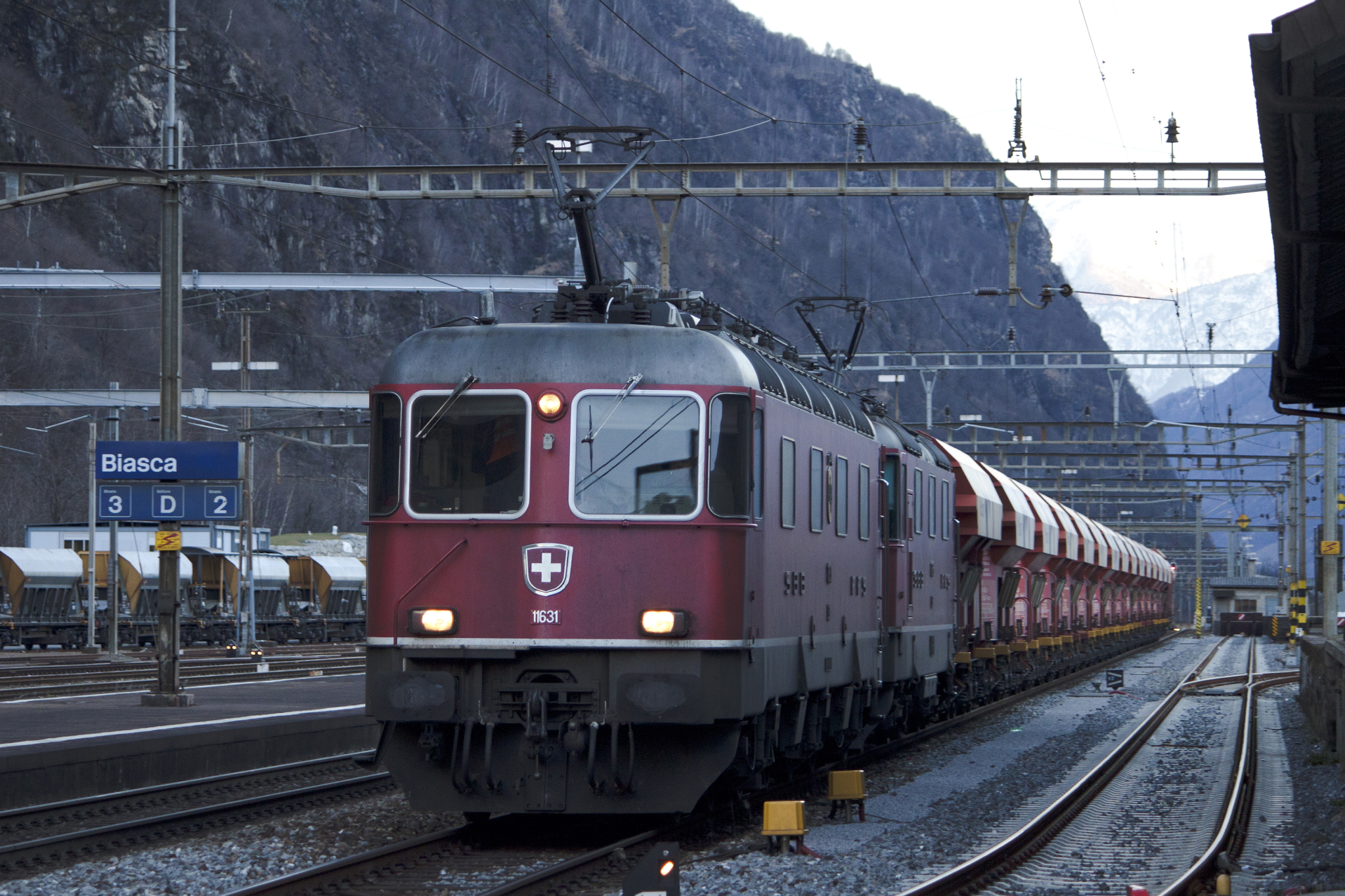
A SBB Re 6-6 leading a SBB Re 4-4 pulls a train through Biasca

The Gotthard Railway Company worked the Gotthard railway until 1909, when it became part of the Swiss Federal Railways. This was seven years after the creation of that state owned railway, and the Gotthard railway was the last major railway to be absorbed.

== Route ==
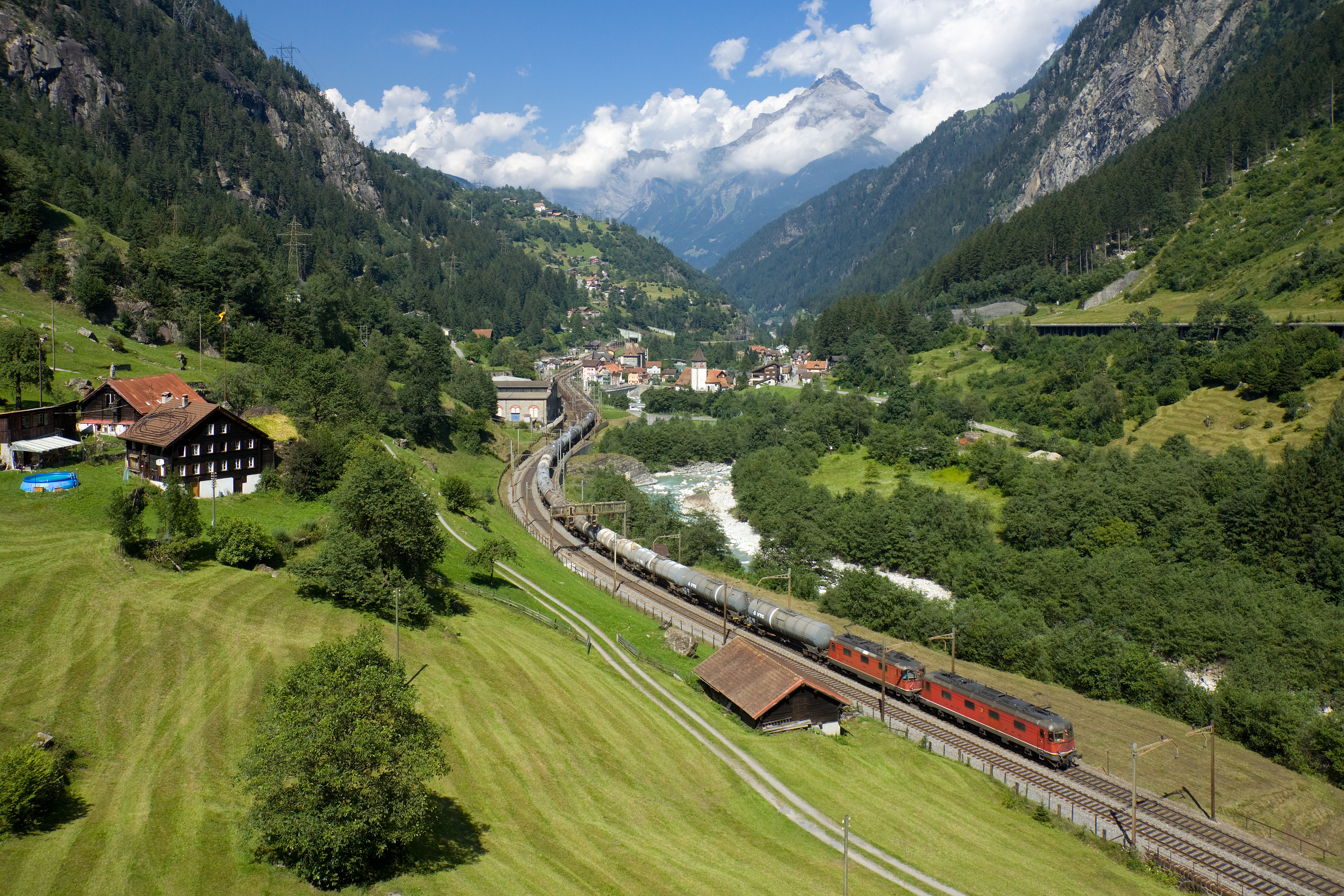
A RE 6 6 leads an oil train just after Gurtnellen

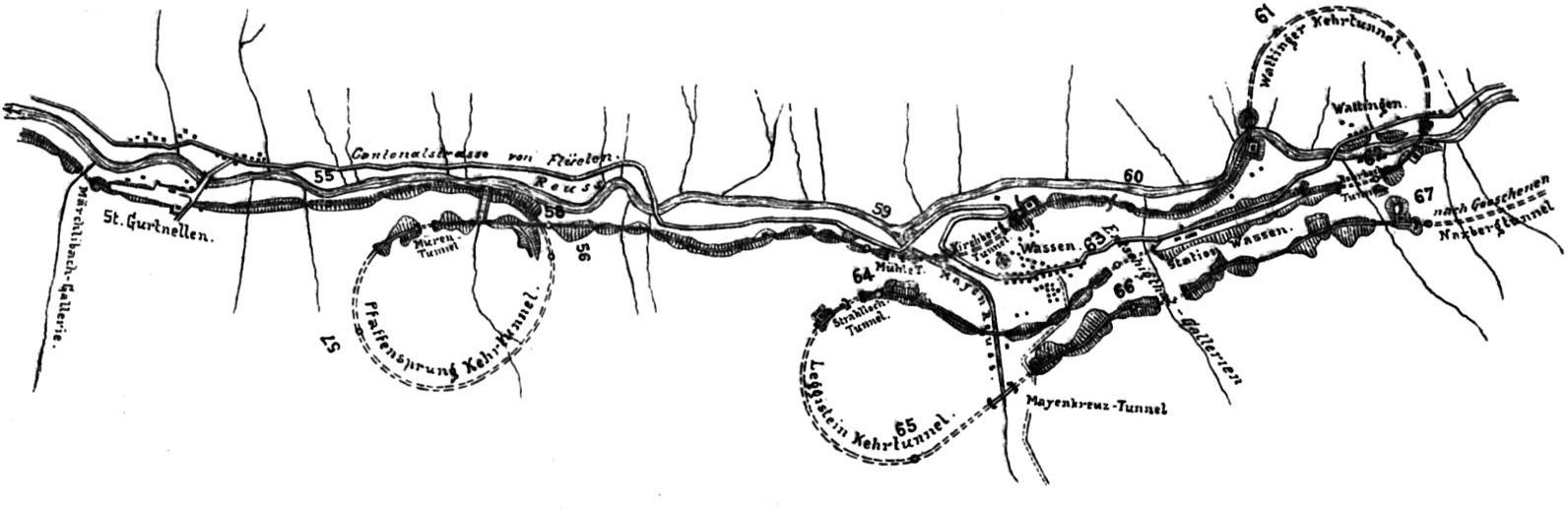
Pfaffensprung spiral tunnel and double loop at Wassen on northern ramps

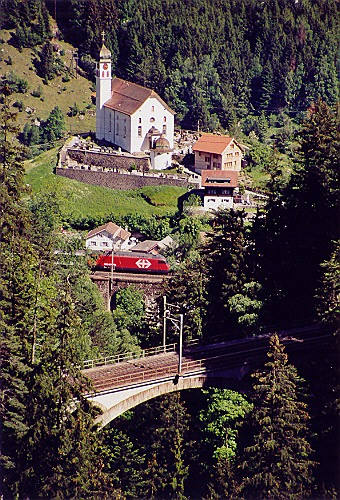
A SBB Re 460 (center), the church of Wassen in the background, and the Upper and Middle Meienreuss Bridges of the Gotthardbahn (below) as seen from the road to the Susten Pass

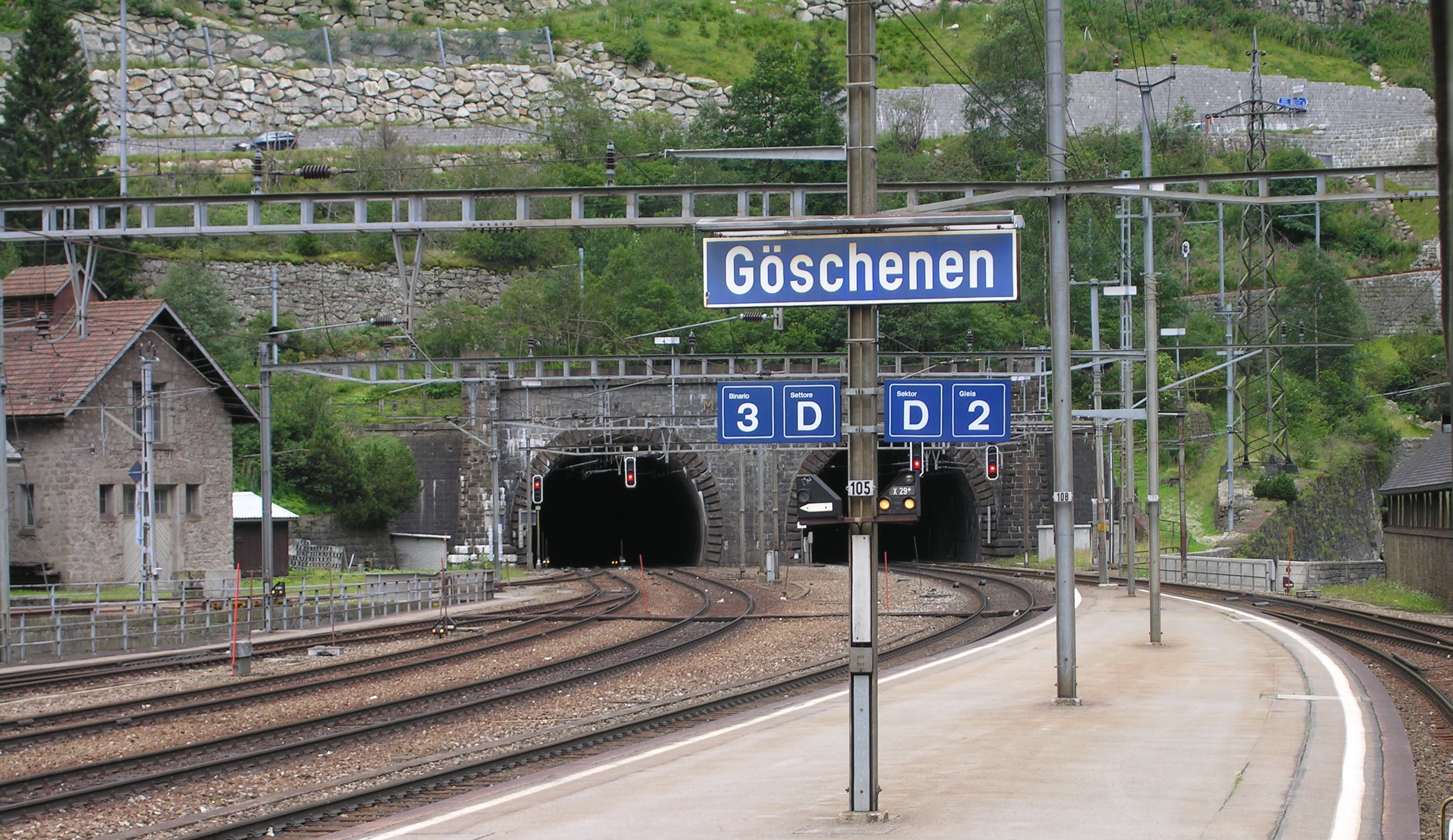
Entrance to the Gotthard Tunnel from Göschenen station

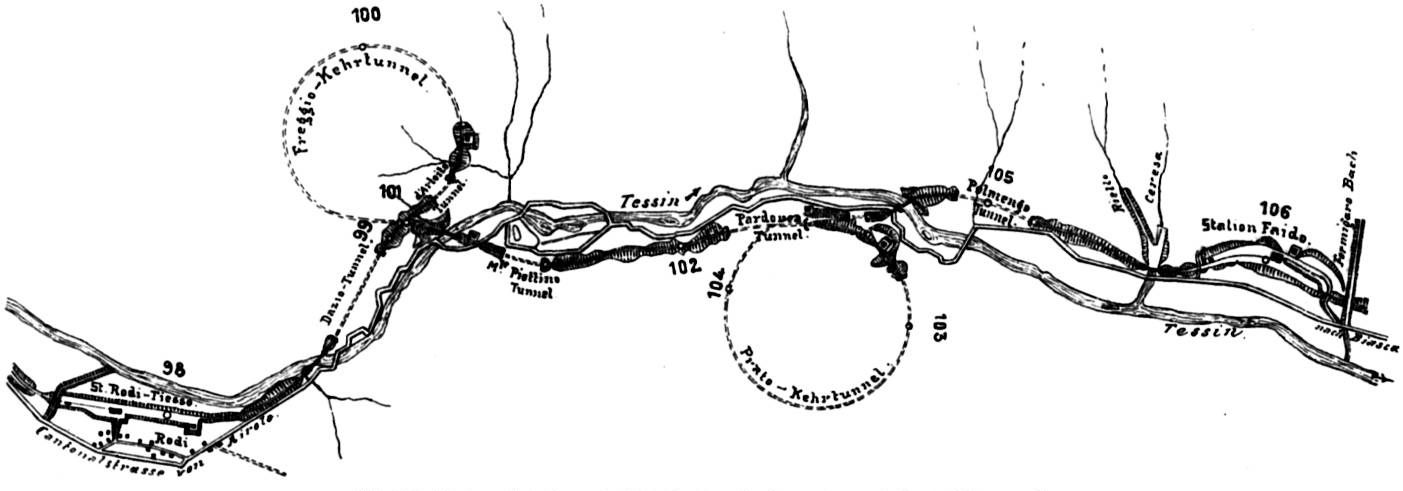
Freggio and Prato Spiral Tunnels on the southern ramp

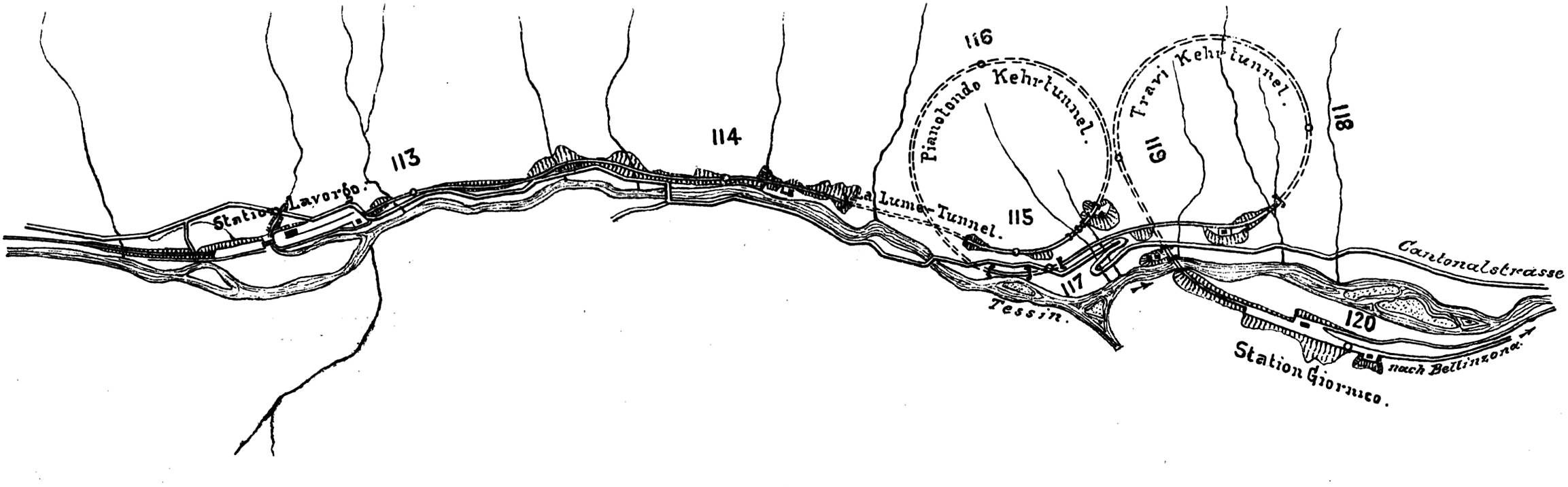
The Biaschina-Loops (Pianotondo- and Travi spiral tunnels) on the southern ramp

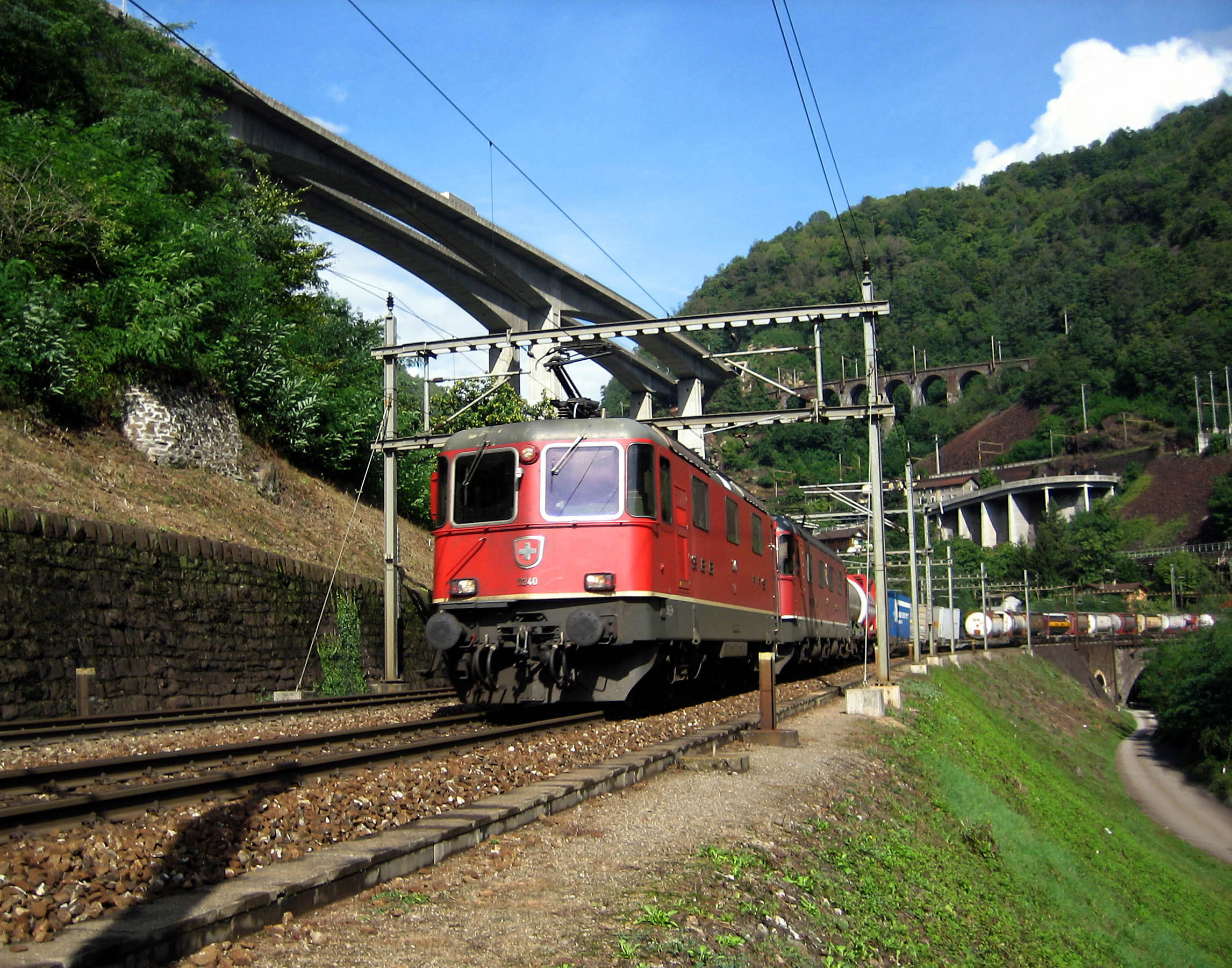
An Intermodal train led by a RE 4 4 followed by a RE 6 6 shortly after passing the Biaschina-Loops. The three levels of track can be identified by their associated electrification gantries. The various concrete structures carry roads

=== North of Arth-Goldau ===
The Lucerne branch of the Gotthard railway commences in Lucerne, facing the south shore of Lake Lucerne. From here it undertakes a 270 degree turn, heading first south, then west, north and east, as well as crossing the river Reuss, to reach the north shore of the lake. From here it continues along the west shore of the Küssnacht arm of the lake to reach Immensee. Here it meets the Rotkreuz branch, which runs from Rotkreuz to the north.

Immensee station is considered the starting point of the main line of the Gotthard railway, and official distances to all points south are measured from here. From Immensee, the line follows the Lake of Zug to Arth-Goldau, at an altitude of 510 metres (1,670 ft). Here it is joined by the Zug branch of the Gotthard railways, and there is a junction with the Südostbahn route to Rapperswil and Romanshorn. Connection is also made with the Arth-Rigi-Bahn, a rack railway climbing the Rigi.

The Zug branch of the Gotthard railway commences in the city of Zug. It joins at Zug with the line to Zürich via Thalwil. The line then follows the east shore of the Lake of Zug to reach Arth-Goldau.

=== Arth-Goldau–Erstfeld ===
From Arth-Goldau, the line then follows the Lauerzer See and passes Schwyz, the capital of the canton of Schwyz, at an altitude of 455 metres (1,493 ft). From Brunnen to Flüelen, the line follows Lake Lucerne (that part of it is also referred to as Urnersee). In that section, the Axen, the two tracks follow two different routes mainly in tunnel because the second track was built later (up to 1943) and on a straighter route through longer tunnels.

At Flüelen station, the railway makes a connection with the steamer services on Lake Lucerne. Steamers operate a shorter, in distance, but longer, in time, service to the city of Lucerne, serving many other towns and villages along the lake shore. The Gotthard Panorama Express uses this interchange to provide its tourist oriented boat and rail service between Lucerne and Lugano.

Erstfeld, at an altitude of 472 metres (1,549 ft), is reached via Altdorf. The depot at Erstfeld houses rolling stock needed for banking service on the Gotthard route. A Ce 6/8 "Crocodile" serves as a memorial for the legendary Gotthard locomotives.

=== Northern ramp, Erstfeld–Göschenen ===
For the whole of the northern ramp from Erstfeld to Göschenen, the line follows the valley of the Reuss. The track now gets steeper with a gradient of up to 2‰. After Amsteg the line passes the Chärstelenbach Bridge and changes the side of the valley over the Intschireuss Bridge, which is, with its 77 metres (253 ft), the highest bridge in the SBB network.

After Gurtnellen, at an altitude of 738 metres (2,421 ft), the first of several tunneled railway spirals is encountered; their purpose is mainly to gain height where no space is available. Two of them form the double loop of Wassen, at an altitude of 928 metres (3,045 ft), which allows the famous church of Wassen to be seen three times from different perspectives, first from below and the last time from 200 metres (660 ft) above. The line passes over the Reuss twice, and the Meienreuss three times in this section.

After a 1,570-metre-long (5,150 ft) tunnel, the line reaches Göschenen, at an altitude of 1,106 metres (3,629 ft). Here the Gotthard line meets the Schöllenenbahn, a metre gauge rack operated branch of the Matterhorn Gotthard Bahn that ascends to Andermatt, where connections can be made over the Oberalppass to Chur or through the Furka Base Tunnel to Brig.

=== Gotthard Tunnel ===
Immediately after Göschenen station, the Gotthard railway enters the Gotthard Tunnel, a 15,003-metre-long (49,222 ft), double-track tunnel, built as one tube. The highest point of the Gotthard line is within this tunnel, 1,151 metres (3,776 ft) above sea level, which makes it the second highest standard railway in Switzerland, after the Lötschberg railway line, the other main north-south axis in the country. Here the tunnel crosses the border between the canton of Uri and the canton of Ticino, and the line passes from the German-speaking part of Switzerland to the Italian-speaking part.

The line exits the tunnel at Airolo, at an altitude of 1,142 metres (3,747 ft) in the valley of the river Ticino, which it follows as far as Bellinzona. Both north and south portals are within a few hundreds metres from those of the Gotthard Road Tunnel.

The approaches to the Gotthard Tunnel are susceptible to rockfalls, regularly leading to closures of the railway line. In the worst such incident in recent times, the Gotthard line was closed to all traffic for almost one month following a rockfall near Gurtnellen on 5 June 2012, which killed one rail worker and injured two others. The closure caused massive disruption to both passenger and international freight traffic.

=== Southern ramp, Airolo–Bellinzona ===
After passing through Airolo, the line crosses the Ticino and descends through its valley in the Leventina. Between Airolo and Biasca the line falls by no less than 849 metres (2,785 ft) in 46 kilometres (29 mi).

At Piotta, the Funicolare del Ritom ascends to the Ritom dam. Beyond Rodi-Fiesso, at an altitude of 942 metres (3,091 ft), the most impressive section of the southern ramp begins. The valley narrows to the Piotta canyon, and the line passes two spirals ("Piottino-Loops") to lose 200 metres (660 ft) in height before reaching Faido. Two more spirals, known as the "Biaschina-Loops", lead the line down to Giornico, at an altitude of 391 metres (1,283 ft).

By the time the line has arrived at Biasca, at an altitude of 293 metres (961 ft), the valley has widened, and the gradient reduced. From Biasca the line continues to follow the Ticino as far as Bellinzona, at an altitude of 241 metres (791 ft) and the capital of the canton of Ticino.

=== Bellinzona–Luino / Locarno ===
Just beyond Bellinzona, a major junction is reached at Giubiasco. Here the original main line branches off what is now considered the main Gotthard line to Lugano and Chiasso.

What was originally considered the main line continues down the valley of the Ticino, crossing the Italian border and continuing to meet the Italian railway system at Pino on the eastern shore of Lake Maggiore. The line beyond Pino to the Italian town of Luino, although Italian-owned, has always been operated as part of the Swiss system.

At Cadenazzo on the line to Pino, a further branch crosses the Ticino and runs a short distance down the western shore of Lago Maggiore to a terminus at the Swiss resort town of Locarno. Transfer can be made at Locarno to the international metre gauge Domodossola–Locarno railway.

=== Bellinzona–Chiasso ===
At Giubiasco, the line from Immensee to Chiasso reaches its lowest point of 230 metres (750 ft) above sea level. From here the line rises again to Monte Ceneri, the pass between the Sopraceneri and the Sottoceneri, and then passes through the two parallel, single-track Monte Ceneri Rail Tunnels. It reaches the highest point on this part of the line, at Rivera-Bironico, at an altitude of 472 metres (1,549 ft), before descending to Lugano, at an altitude of 335 metres (1,099 ft).

At Lugano interchange is made with the Lugano–Ponte Tresa railway, a metre gauge railway to the town of Ponte Tresa. Following the western waterside of Lake Lugano, the line crosses Lake Lugano at the Melide causeway, a 817-metre-long (2,680 ft) causeway and bridge.

The track follows the eastern waterside from the Melide causeway to Capolago-Riva San Vitale station. Here interchange is made with the Monte Generoso railway, a rack railway to the summit of Monte Generoso. The Gotthard line then continues to Mendrisio and Chiasso. Chiasso houses border controls and has a large international marshalling yard. Conventional trains change locomotives here due to different traction voltages and train protection systems in Italy.

== Operation ==
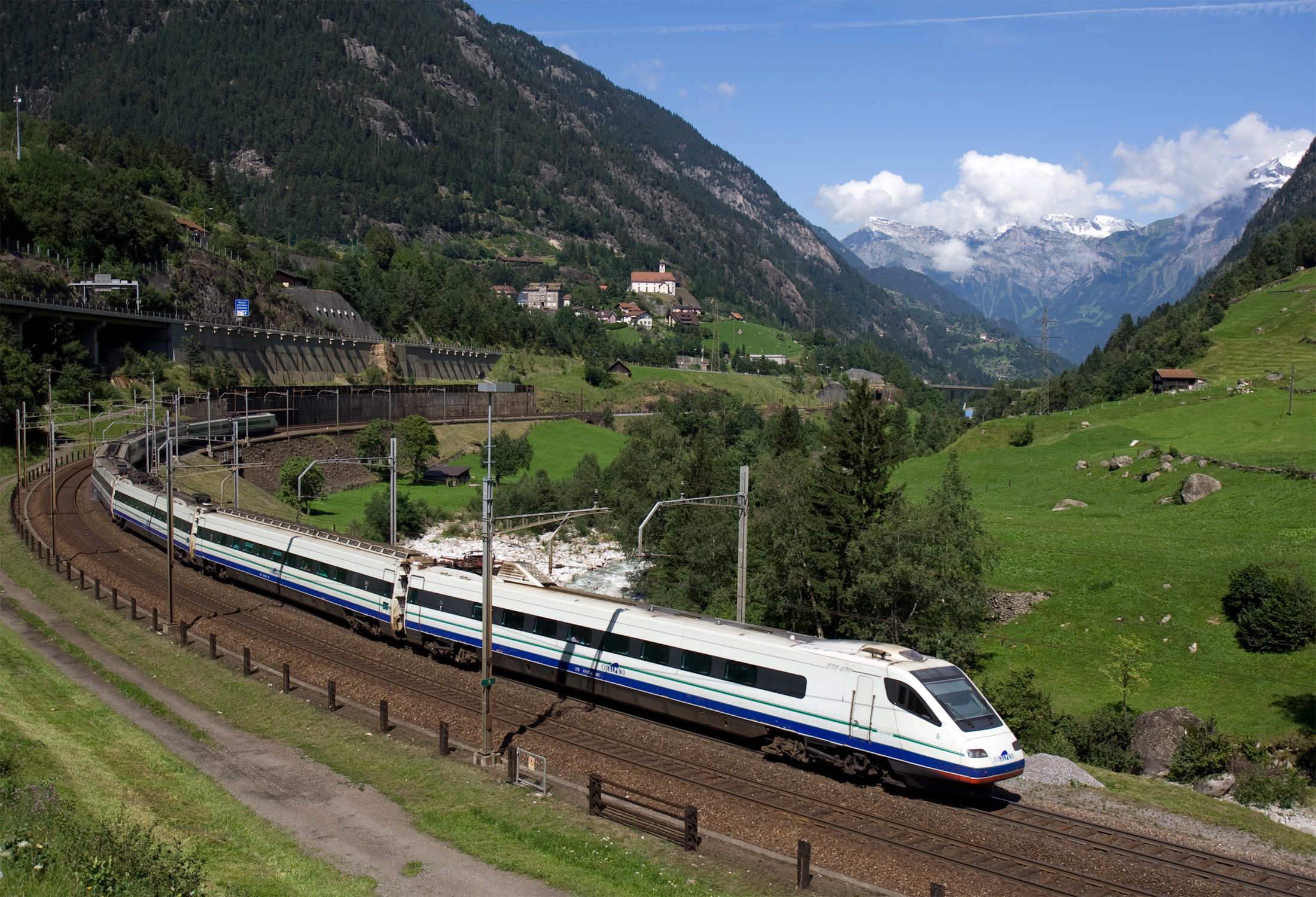
A Cisalpino Pendolino on an EC train at Wassen

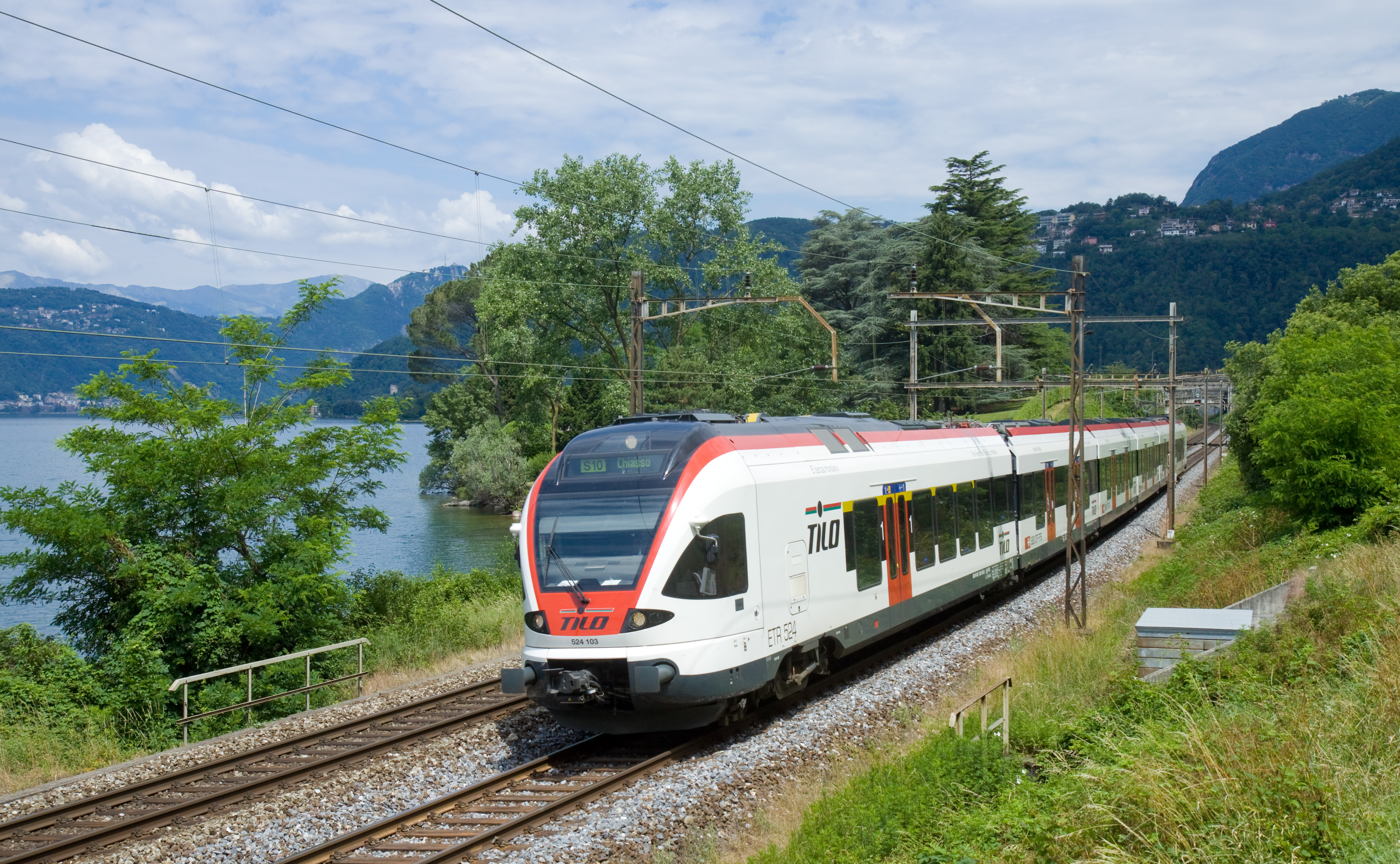
A TILO train on line S10 alongside Lake Lugano

=== Services ===
The Gotthard line carries a mixture of freight and long distance passenger trains over the full length of the line. The long distance passenger trains include EuroCity (EC) trains between Zürich and Milan, and ICN and InterRegio trains between a number of cities in northern Switzerland and various points in Ticino. Passenger trains using the Gotthard line in the past included the Trans Europ Express trains Gottardo, Roland, and Ticino.

Regional commuter rail services also operate on the northern and southern sections of the Gotthard line. To the north, line S2 of the Zug Stadtbahn operates hourly between Zug, Arth-Goldau and Erstfeld, whilst line S3 of the S-Bahn Luzern operates hourly between Lucerne, Arth-Goldau and Brunnen.

To the south, the Gotthard line is served by trains on line S10 of the Treni Regionali Ticino Lombardia (TILO), which operate every half-hour between Bellinzona, Lugano and Chiasso, with some trains extending northwards to Airolo and southwards to Milan. The same operator's lines S20 and S30 also operate over the Gotthard railway in the Bellinzona area, before proceeding down the branches to Locarno and Luino respectively, with some S30 trains extended to Milan Malpensa Airport.

Besides trains operated by the Swiss Federal Railways, other railway companies have also been able to run trains on the Gotthard route since the introduction of open access in 2001. Companies that have taken advantage of this include Deutsche Bahn AG, who operate through freight trains from Germany to Italy.

=== Rolling stock ===
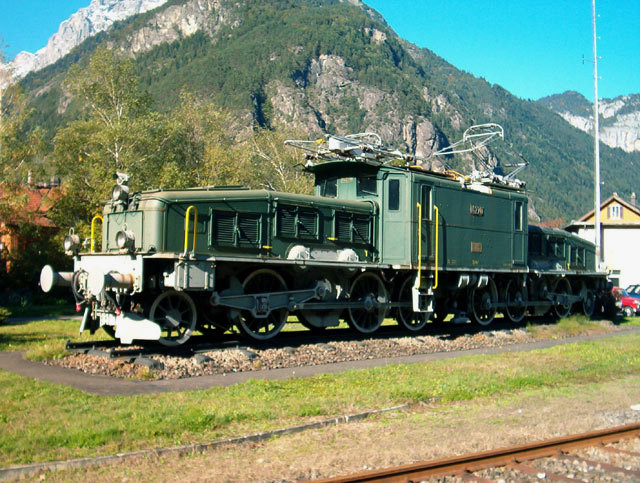
A preserved "Crocodile" at Erstfeld - 14270 is now protected from weather and may return as a monument to Zürich Oerlikon, its birthplace

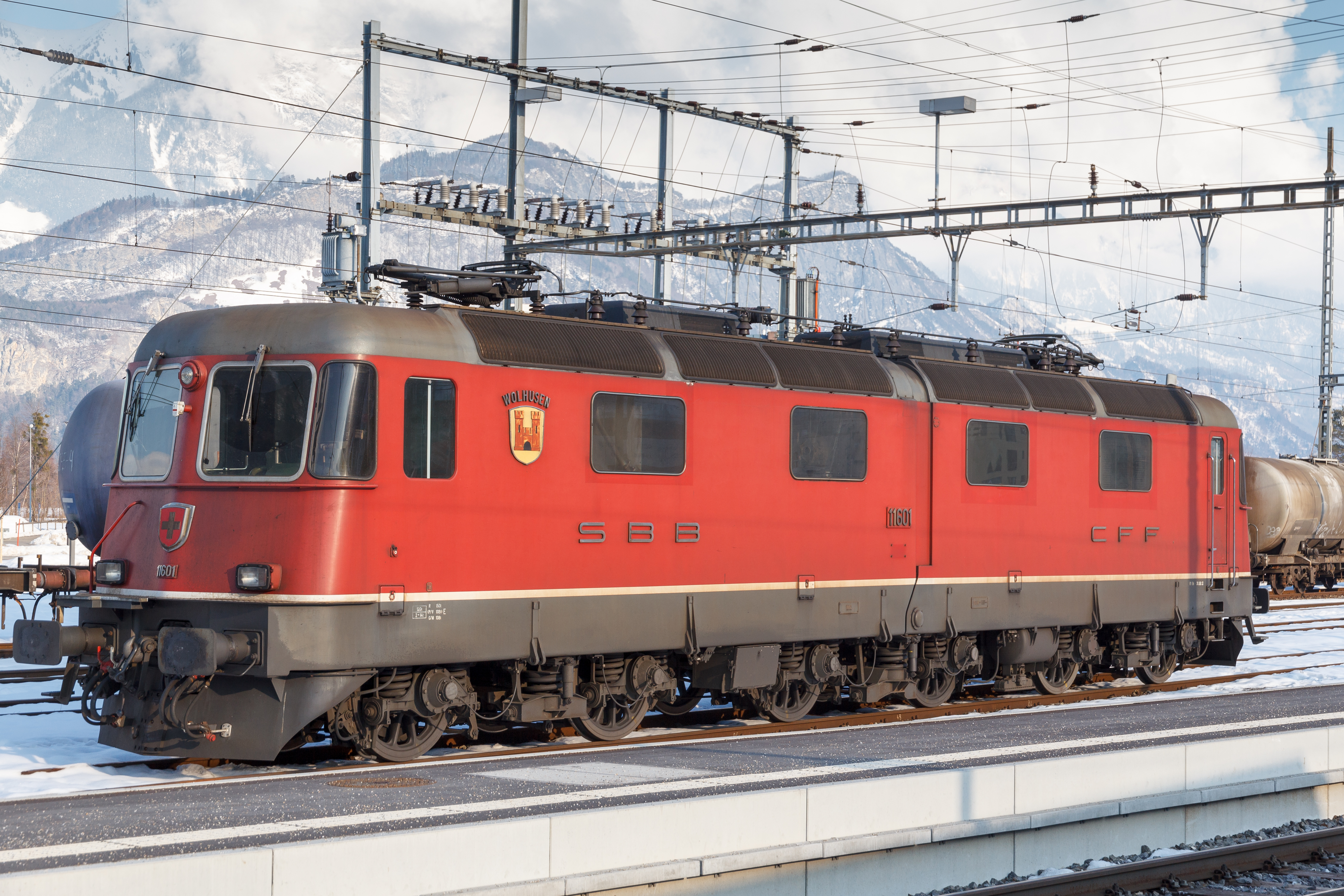
SBB Re 6-6 Nr. 10601 at Wolhusen

Most of the Swiss locomotives were originally constructed for the Gotthard line, so many of them were called "Gotthardlokomotiven", for instance C 5/6 "Elephant", Ce 6/8 and Be 6/8 "Krokodil", Ae 8/14 "Landilok", Ae 6/6, Re 620. Famous trainsets on the Gotthard route are the Trans Europ Express and the Roter Pfeil, as well as the tilting train, Cisalpino Pendolino.

Nowadays passenger trains are mostly pulled by Re 4/4 ^{II} (up to two for long trains) and sometimes by Re 460, freight trains by Re 6/6 and Re 4/4 ^{III}. Up to 1300 tons may be pulled by an Re 6/6 with an Re 4/4 ^{III}. This combination is sometimes called a Re 10/10. If the trains are heavier, then any additional locomotives must be used as banking locomotives at the rear of the train, because the tractive effort of more power at the front of the train would exceed the capacity of the couplers within the train.

== Civil engineering ==
=== Bridges ===
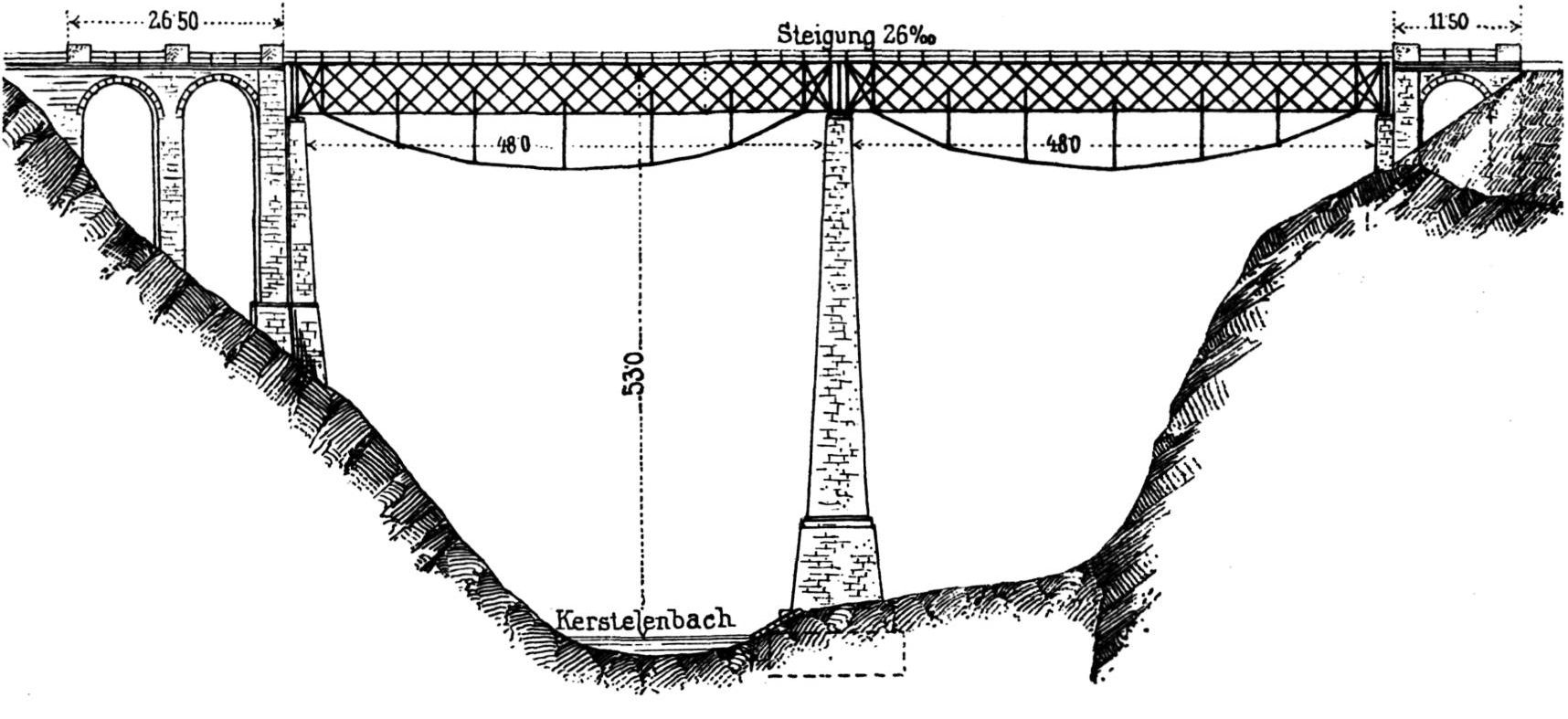
Chärstelenbach Bridge near Amsteg with fish-belly reinforcements

The Gotthardbahn and its branchlines pass over a total of 1234 bridges and open passages which span a total of 6,471 metres (21,230 ft). Arch bridges from stone were only constructed up to a clear width of 12 metres (39 ft), bridging larger distances with iron superstructures, which therefore became a frequent sight on the original Gotthard line, their iron representing a weight of 17723 tons. The construction of each bridge represented its own individual challenge, depending on the surrounding geography and geology.

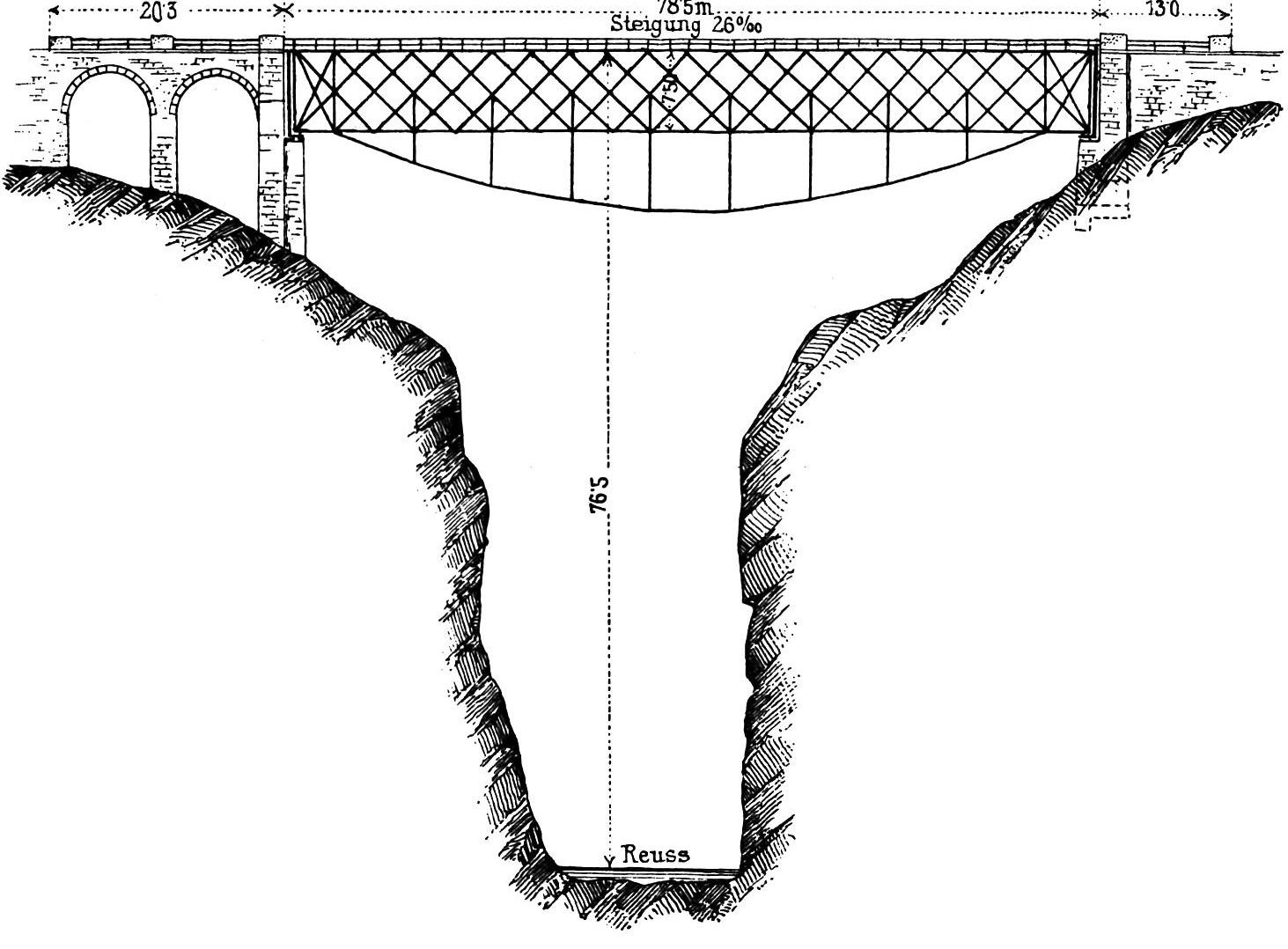
Intschireuss Bridge with fish-belly reinforcement

With the exception of three arch bridges all steel bridges consisted of very simple, straight, single beam truss constructions. These had to be reinforced already before 1914 still during steam operation of the Gotthardbahn due to quickly increasing traffic and load. Fish-belly truss structures were attached to the bridges from below where possible and an arch truss structure was added from the top, where a short clear height made this necessary, besides other measures. Eventually all original iron bridges had to be replaced with modern bridges because they had been built and were repeatedly reinforced to specifications that again and again were surpassed by increasing traffic, velocity and load.

Notable originally single beam truss bridges on the Gotthardbahn are:

- The Chärstelenbach Bridge has two passage ways with clear widths of 50 metres (160 ft) each and rails at 53 metres (174 ft) above low water. The bridge was reinforced with a fish-belly structure. The modern replacement still uses the centre column and the stone arch abutments of the original.
- The Intschireuss Bridge spans the widest clear width of 75 metres (246 ft), with rails at 76 metres (249 ft) above low water. The bridge was reinforced with a "fish-belly" before the iron structure was replaced.
- The Middle Meienreuss Bridge spans 65 metres (213 ft) with rails 72 metres (236 ft) above the river bottom. The original iron construction has been replaced.

== Recent developments ==
The historical route, with its long climbs and spiral routings, restricts speed and capacity on this important international route. As a result, a largely new lower level route was constructed as the Gotthard axis of the NRLA project.

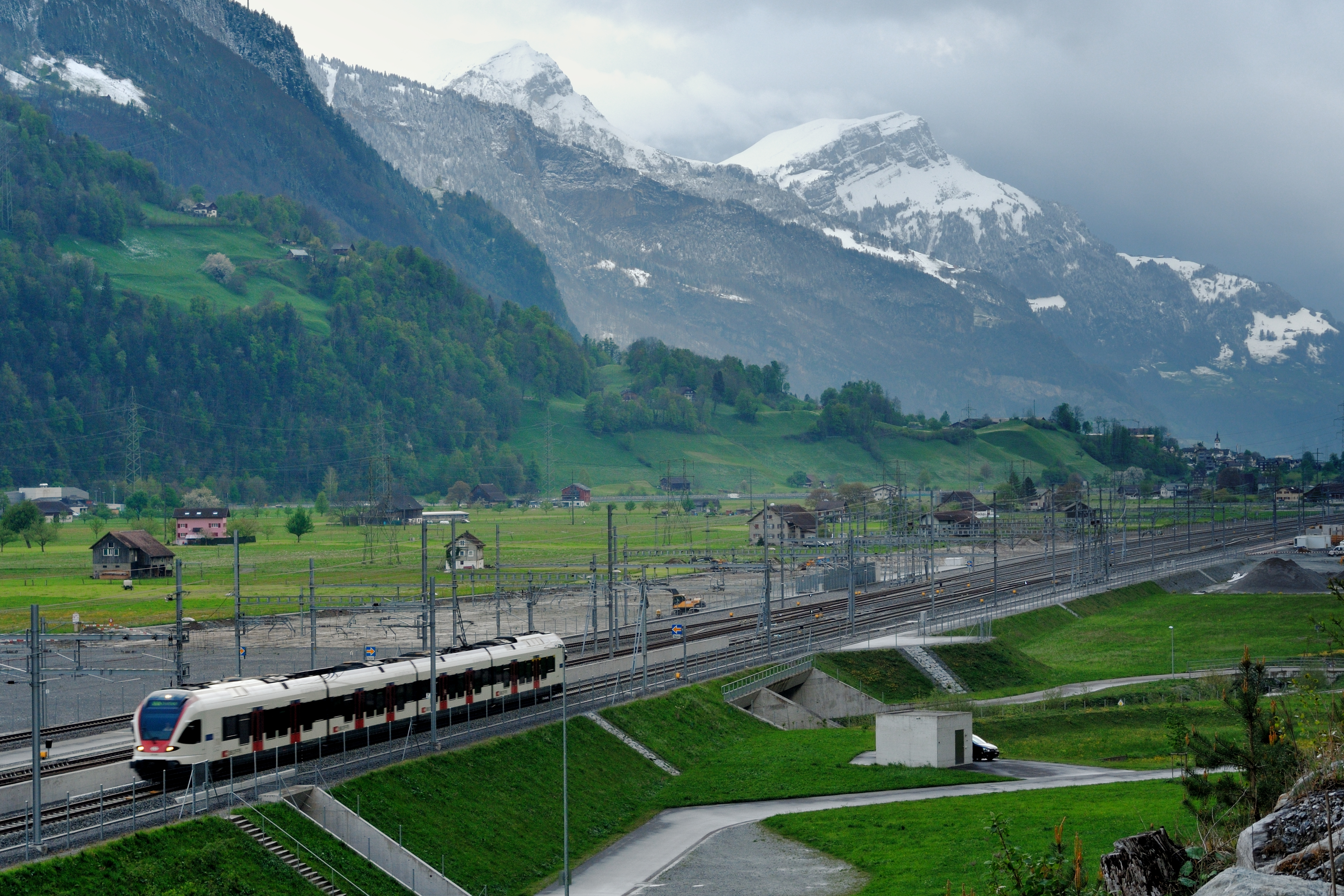
A train about to pass over the north portal of the Gotthard Base Tunnel

The Gotthard Base Tunnel, running from a point near Erstfeld to a point near Biasca, opened to traffic on 1 June 2016, with full service starting in December of that year. With a route length of 57.1 km (35.5 mi), this is the world's longest railway tunnel, surpassing the Seikan Tunnel in Japan. Its maximum altitude of 550 metres (1,800 ft) is less than half the altitude of the current Gotthard Tunnel, and obviates the need to haul trains up long approach grades. Although given its name, because it bypasses the Gotthard Tunnel, the base tunnel's route is actually some 14 kilometres (8.7 mi) to the east, passing under Sedrun, rather than the Gotthard Pass, but still below the Saint-Gotthard Massif. This redundancy helped relieve some of the new tunnel's traffic after a train accident on 10 August 2023 severely reduced capacity.

The Ceneri Base Tunnel, from Camorino to the south of Bellinzona, and Vezia to the north of Lugano, opened in 2020. This tunnel has a route length of 15.4 kilometres (9.6 mi) and allows trains to bypass the steep grades of Monte Ceneri.

The Gotthard Base Tunnel opened in 2016, and the Ceneri Base Tunnel in 2020. Now that they have opened, all rail traffic still needs to use the existing route north of Erstfeld, between Biasca and Bellinzona, and south of Lugano. The bypassed sections of the existing route are being retained for local passenger services, for general capacity and as a diversionary route.

Further bypasses have been planned as part of the Gotthard axis of the NRLA project, including a new largely tunnelled route from Arth-Goldau to Erstfeld, and an extension of the existing Zimmerberg Base Tunnel on the route between Zürich and Zug. No commitment to construct these sections of line has yet been made.

Operator Südostbahn has announced that, as of 13 December 2020, it will run a new service from Basel and Zurich via the original Gotthard line, using Stadler Flirt units which are also used on the Voralpen express.
