= Ticinese =

Ticinese is the adjective form of Ticino and can refer to:

- Something of or related to Ticino
  - Ticinese dialect
- Something related to the river Ticino
  - Porta Ticinese Quartiere of Milan taking the name from the Gate of the medieval walls of Milan
