= Sottoceneri =

Coordinates: 45°58′45″N 8°57′30″E

The Sottoceneri ('Under the Ceneri'; Ticinese: Sotascender) is the part of the Swiss canton of Ticino that lies to the south of the Monte Ceneri Pass through the Lugano Prealps. It includes the Swiss shore of Lake Lugano, and the cities and towns of Lugano, Mendrisio and Chiasso.

The Sottoceneri is not a half-canton with formally defined boundaries, but roughly maps to the districts of Lugano and Mendrisio. The remainder of the canton is described as the Sopraceneri ('Above the Ceneri'), and includes the valley of the Ticino river and the towns of Bellinzona, Biasca, Riviera and Locarno.

Whilst the Sottoceneri comprises 432 square kilometres (167 sq mi), or only about 15% of the land area of the canton, it contains 189,123 people, or 57% of the cantonal population (2008). It is therefore characterised by a markedly higher population density and level of economic activity, when compared to the Sopraceneri.
