= Monte Ceneri Road Tunnel =

Motorway tunnel through the Swiss Alps

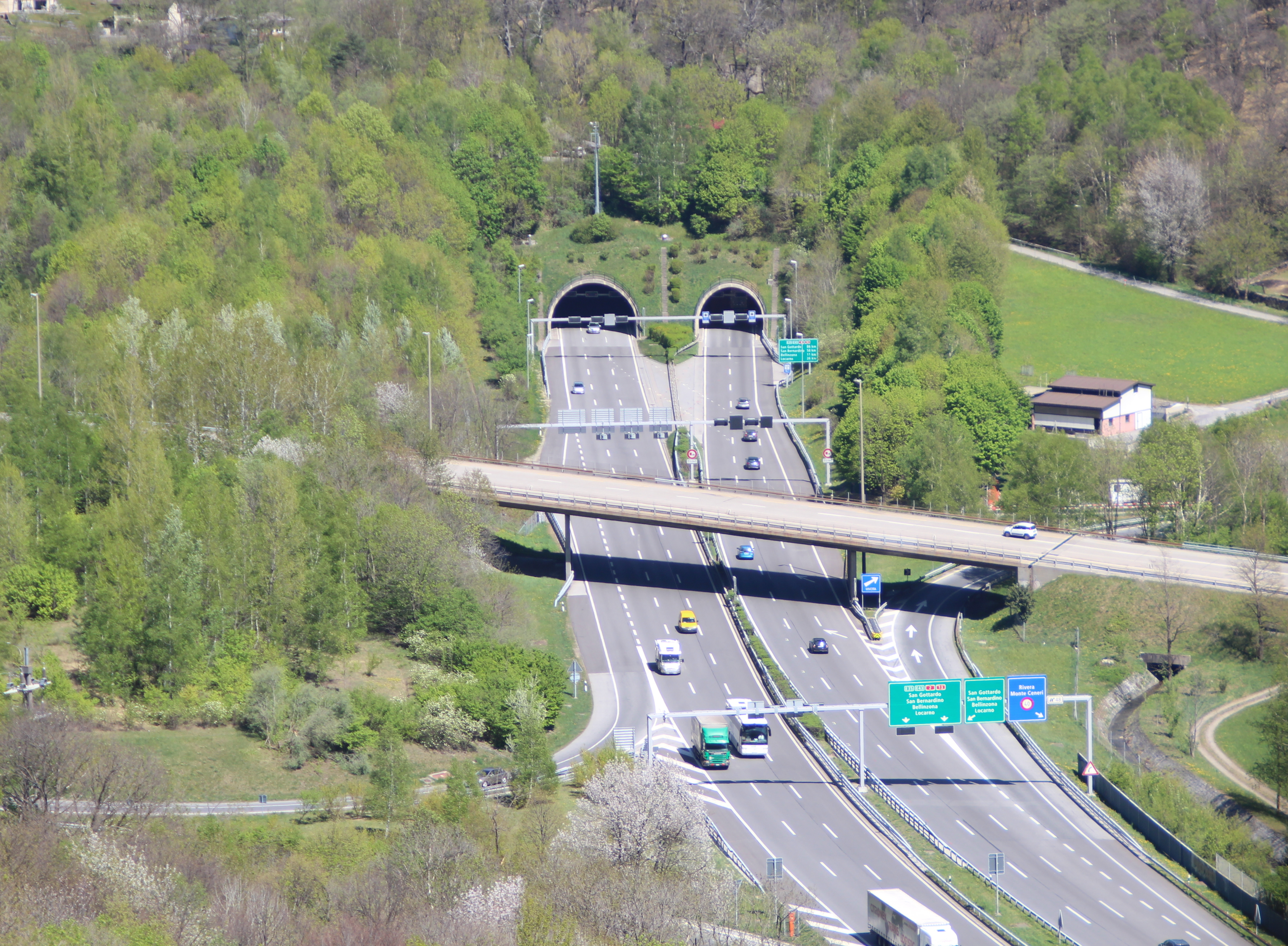
- The Southern access to the Monte Ceneri tunnel
- Interactive map of Monte Ceneri Road Tunnel

Overview
- Location: Canton Ticino, Switzerland
- Coordinates: 46°08′18″N 8°55′24″E
- Status: Active
- Route: A2 motorway

Operation
- Opened: 1984
- Character: road

Technical
- Length: 1,412 metres (4,633 ft)

The Monte Ceneri Road Tunnel is a motorway tunnel in the Swiss canton of Ticino. The tunnel is situated under the Monte Ceneri Pass that separates the north of the canton around Bellinzona from the south of the canton around Lugano. It forms part of the A2 motorway that links the north of Switzerland with Italy. It was completed in 1984, and is 1,412 metres (4,633 ft) in length.

The road tunnel is paralleled by the 1,692 metres (5,551 ft) long Monte Ceneri Rail Tunnel, carrying the Swiss Federal Railways Gotthard line under the same pass.
