= Sopraceneri =

Coordinates: 46°20′N 8°50′E

The Sopraceneri ('Above the Ceneri'; Ticinese: Surascender) is the part of the Swiss canton of Ticino that lies to the north of the Monte Ceneri Pass through the Lugano Prealps. It includes the whole of the valley of the Ticino river and its side valleys, the Swiss shore of Lake Maggiore, the cities of Bellinzona and Locarno, as well as towns including Biasca and Riviera.

The Sopraceneri is not a half-canton with formally defined boundaries, but roughly maps to the districts of Bellinzona, Blenio, Leventina, Locarno, Riviera and Vallemaggia. The remainder of the canton is described as the Sottoceneri ('Under the Ceneri'), and includes the towns of Lugano, Mendrisio and Chiasso.

Whilst the Sopraceneri comprises 2,379 square kilometres (919 sq mi), or about 85% of the land area of the canton, it contains 142,627 people, or only 43% of the cantonal population (2008). It is therefore characterised by a markedly lower population density and level of economic activity, when compared to the Sottoceneri.
