= Monte Ceneri =

Mountain pass in Ticino, Switzerland

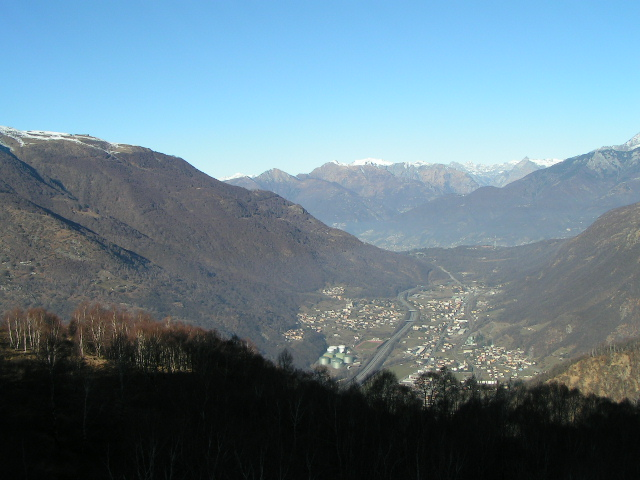
- Monte Ceneri looking north

- Location within Switzerland
- Elevation: 554 metres (1,818 ft)
- Traversed by: Road, rail

Third Approach
- Location: Ticino, Switzerland
- Range: Lugano Prealps
- Coordinates: 46°8′21″N 8°54′24″E

Monte Ceneri is a mountain pass in the canton of Ticino in Switzerland. It connects the Magadino Plain and the Vedeggio Valley across the Lugano Prealps at an elevation of 554 metres (1,818 ft) above sea level. It provides the most direct route between the cities of Bellinzona and Lugano. Despite its name (monte is the Italian word for "mountain"), Monte Ceneri is the lowest point on the crest between Monte Tamaro and the Camoghè.

Two tunnels have been dug under Monte Ceneri, the Monte Ceneri Road Tunnel for the A2 motorway and the Monte Ceneri Rail Tunnel for the Gotthard railway. A new rail tunnel, the Ceneri Base Tunnel, was opened in 2020, and connects Camorino near Bellinzona and Vezia near Lugano.

The pass is situated in the recently created municipality of Monteceneri and the district of Lugano. The Monte Ceneri radio transmitter is located close to the pass.

The larger part of Ticino, which lies to the north of Monte Ceneri and includes the valley of the Ticino river and the cities of Bellinzona and Locarno, is often referred to as the Sopraceneri (above the Ceneri). The smaller part to the south, which includes Lugano, Mendrisio and Chiasso, takes the name Sottoceneri (under the Ceneri).

== See also ==
- List of mountain passes in Switzerland
- NRLA
