= Monte Ceneri transmitter =

Coordinates: 46°08′26.21″N 8°54′56.16″E

The Monte Ceneri transmitter was first established as the nationwide medium-wave radio transmission station for Italian-speaking Switzerland in 1933. Located on Monte Ceneri in Ticino, it broadcast on a frequency of 558 kHz.

== 1933 mast ==
The original transmission mast – a 120-metre-high free-standing lattice tower insulated from the ground – was constructed in the Monte Ceneri pass (at 46°8'26"N 8°54'56"E). Today this tower is used for DAB and DVB-T broadcasting, for which purposes a 15-metre-high antenna has been added at the top, so that the full height of the mast is now 135 metres.

== 1978 mast ==
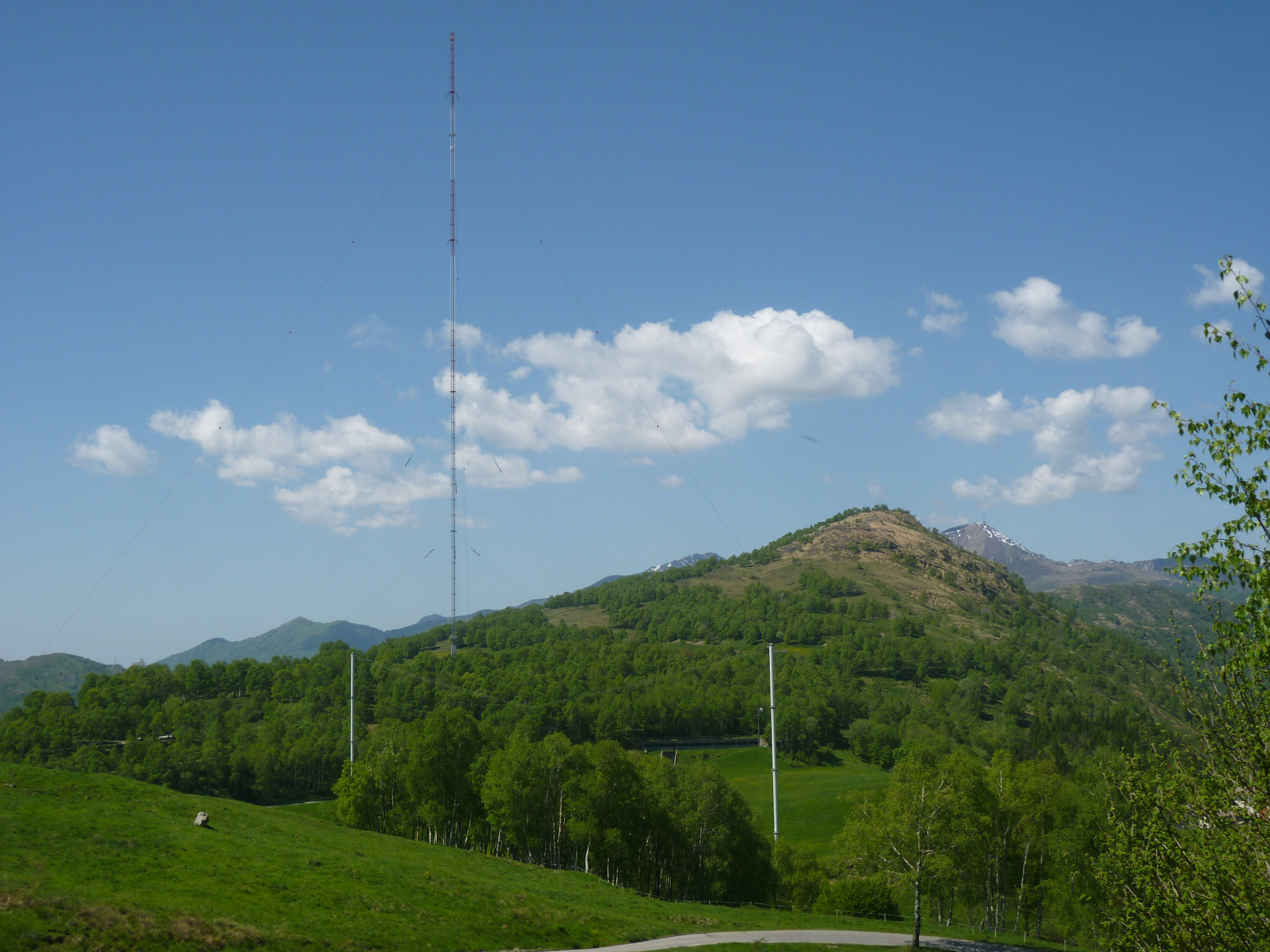
The 1978 tower is 220 metres high

In 1978 a new facility for the Monte Ceneri transmitter was built north of Isone (at 46°8'19"N 8°59'25"E). This uses as its main antenna a 220-metre guyed lattice-steel mast insulated from the ground and, as backup, a T-antenna, which is suspended between two guyed tubular-steel masts. The main mast – which is the only tall guyed mast in Switzerland, as well as being the country's second-tallest tower-type structure – is equipped with an elevator, the machinery of which is installed in a compartment just above the basement insulator.

Despite the location change, the old name of the transmitter was retained. On 30 June 2008 the transmitter was shut down. The Voice of Russia (VoR) subsequently expressed an interest in acquiring a licence to broadcast from the site using the 558 kHz frequency and on 9 February 2011 it received permission from the Swiss Federal Office of Communications to do so. VoR began transmissions from Monte Ceneri on 1 April 2011; it has been reported, however, that these will cease after 31 December 2012. In July 2016 the scheduled demolition of the nowadays unused mast has begun.
