= Ticinese dialect =

Lombard dialects of Ticino, Switzerland

Ticinese
- Ticinees
- Native to: Switzerland
- Region: Switzerland: Ticino (Sopraceneri)
- Native speakers: 108,000 (2011)
- Language family: Indo-European: Italic; Latino-Faliscan; Romance; Italo-Western; Western Romance; Gallo-Romance; Gallo-Italic; Lombard–Piedmontese?; Lombard; Western Lombard; Ticinese

Language codes
- ISO 639-3: –
- Glottolog: tici1238
- IETF: lmo-u-sd-chti

The Ticinese dialect is the set of dialects, belonging to the Alpine and Western branch of the Lombard language, spoken in the northern part of the Canton of Ticino (Sopraceneri); the dialects of the region can generally vary from valley to valley, often even between single localities, while retaining the mutual intelligibility that is typical of the Lombard linguistic continuum.

Ticinese koiné refers instead to a koiné form used by speakers of local dialects (particularly those diverging from the koiné itself, as, e.g., Leventinese, etc.) when communicating with speakers of other Western Lombard dialects of Ticino, the Grisons (collectively known as Swiss Italian) or Italian Lombardy.

== Status ==
Ticinese is generally more lively than the Western Lombard varieties spoken in Italy, with a significant number of young speakers. Some radio and television programmes in Ticinese, mostly comedies are broadcast by the Italian language broadcasting company RTSI.

A dictionary and some studies on the Ticinese variants are published by CDE – Centro di dialettologia e di etnografia, a cantonal research institution.

== Examples ==
Some possible expressions and idioms:

| English | Ticinese | Italiano |
|---|---|---|
| Delicious potatoes | Patati delizioos | Patate deliziose |
| To be naive | Beev l'acqua dal cudee | Credere a tutto ed a tutti |
| One makes nothing out of nothing | Chi gh'à al goss al gh'à quaicoss, se i gh'à nagott al gh'à al goss da carezz | Con niente si fa nulla |

== See also ==
- Swiss Italian

== Bibliography ==
- Centro di dialettologia e di etnografia, LSI – Lessico dialettale della Svizzera italiana, Bellinzona 2004.
- Comrie, Bernard, Matthews, Stephen and Polinsky, Maria: The Atlas of Languages: The Origin and Development of Languages Throughout the World. Rev. ed., New York 2003.
- Lurà, Franco: Il dialetto del Mendrisiotto, Mendrisio–Chiasso 1987.
- Lurati, Ottavio: Dialetto e italiano regionale nella Svizzera italiana, Lugano 1976.
- Petrini, Dario: La koinè ticinese (Romanica Helvetica vol. 105), Bern 1988.
- VSI – Vocabolario dei dialetti della Svizzera italiana, Lugano / Bellinzona 1952–.
