= Monte Ceneri Rail Tunnel =

Railway tunnel through the Swiss Alps

- Interactive map of Monte Ceneri Rail Tunnel

Overview
- Line: Gotthard
- Location: Canton Ticino, Switzerland
- Coordinates: 46°08′19″N 8°55′14″E
- Status: Active

Operation
- Opened: 1882/1913
- Owner: Swiss Federal Railways
- Operator: Swiss Federal Railways
- Traffic: Rail
- Character: Passenger and freight

Technical
- Length: 1,675 metres (5,495 ft)/1,692 metres (5,551 ft)
- No. of tracks: 1 in each of 2 bores
- Track gauge: 1,435 mm (4 ft 8 1/2 in)
- Electrified: Overhead catenary 11 kV AC 16 2/3 Hz

The Monte Ceneri Rail Tunnel is a railway tunnel in the Swiss canton of Ticino. The tunnel is situated under the Monte Ceneri Pass that separates the north of the canton around Bellinzona from the south of the canton around Lugano. It forms part of the Swiss Federal Railways Gotthard line, between Giubiasco and Rivera-Bironico stations. The tunnel comprises two bores, built at different times. The first bore, sometimes known as Monte Ceneri I, was opened on 10 April 1882 and is 1,675 metres (5,495 ft) in length. The second bore, Monte Ceneri II, was opened on 18 October 1933 and is 1,692 metres (5,551 ft) in length. Both bores carry a single standard gauge (1,435 mm or 4 ft 8 1/2 in) track electrified at 15 kV AC 16 2/3 Hz using overhead catenary.

The rail tunnel is paralleled by the Monte Ceneri Road Tunnel, carrying the A2 motorway under the same pass. The Ceneri Base Tunnel has recently been completed beneath the pass at a much lower level.
