= VTEC (disambiguation) =

VTEC is Variable Valve Timing and Lift Electronic Control, a system developed by Honda for combustion engines.

VTEC or VTech may also refer to:

- VTech, a Hong Kong global supplier of electronic learning products
- Virgin Trains East Coast, a former train operating company in the United Kingdom
- Verotoxin-producing Escherichia coli, strains of the bacterium Escherichia coli
- Valid Time Event Code, used by the United States National Weather Service to automate and disseminate critical weather information

== See also ==
- Ventricular tachycardia (V-tach)
- VA Tech (disambiguation)
