= Rivera-Bironico railway station =

Railway station in Switzerland

Rivera-Bironico
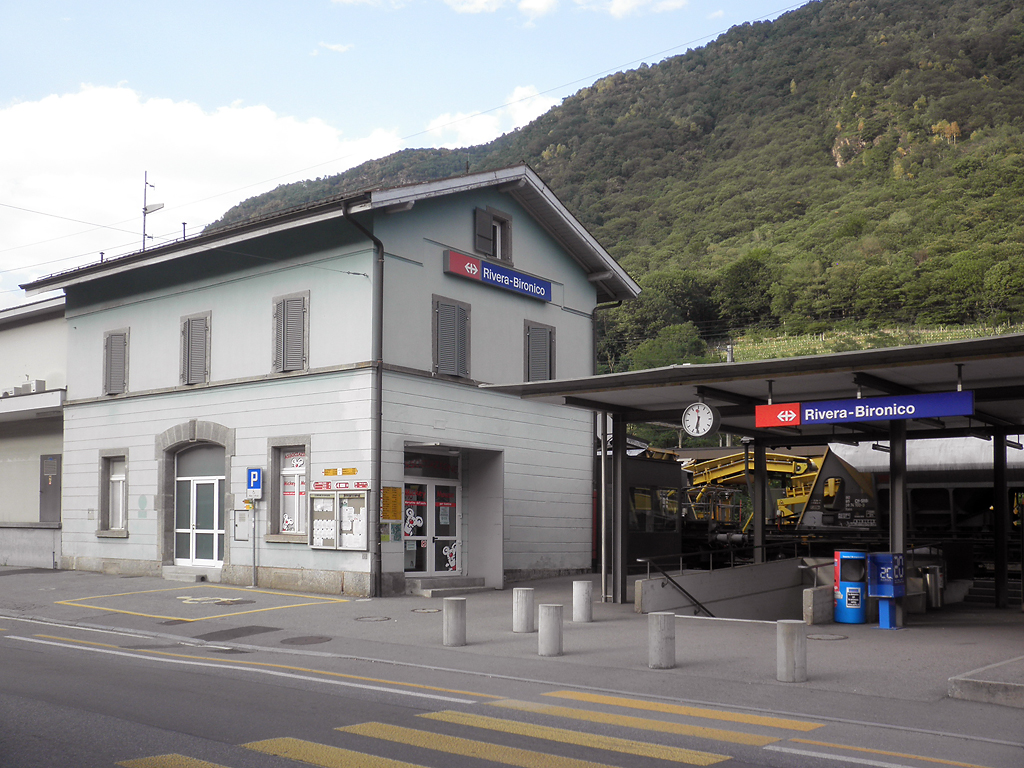
- The station building in 2012

General information
- Location: Via alla Stazione; Monteceneri; Switzerland
- Coordinates: 46°07′26″N 8°55′31″E
- Elevation: 471 m (1,545 ft)
- Owner: Swiss Federal Railways
- Line: Gotthard line
- Distance: 165.2 km (102.7 mi) from Immensee
- Train operators: Treni Regionali Ticino Lombardia
- Connections: Autopostale bus services

Services
Preceding station	TiLo	Following station
Giubiasco Terminus	S90	Mezzovico towards Mendrisio
Location

Rivera-Bironico railway station (Italian: Stazione di Rivera-Bironico) is a railway station in the Swiss canton of Ticino and municipality of Monteceneri. The station takes its name from the nearby villages of Rivera and Bironico, and is on the original line of the Swiss Federal Railways Gotthard railway between Bellinzona and Lugano. This line has been by-passed by the Ceneri Base Tunnel since 2020, and most trains between Lugano and Bellinzona now use the base tunnel rather than passing through Rivera-Bironico station. Just to the north of the station, the line enters the original high-level Monte Ceneri Tunnel.

== Services ==
As of the December 2021 timetable change, the following services stop at Rivera-Bironico:

- S90: half-hourly between Giubiasco and Lugano and hourly service to Mendrisio.
