= Taverne-Torricella railway station =

Railway station in Switzerland

Taverne-Torricella
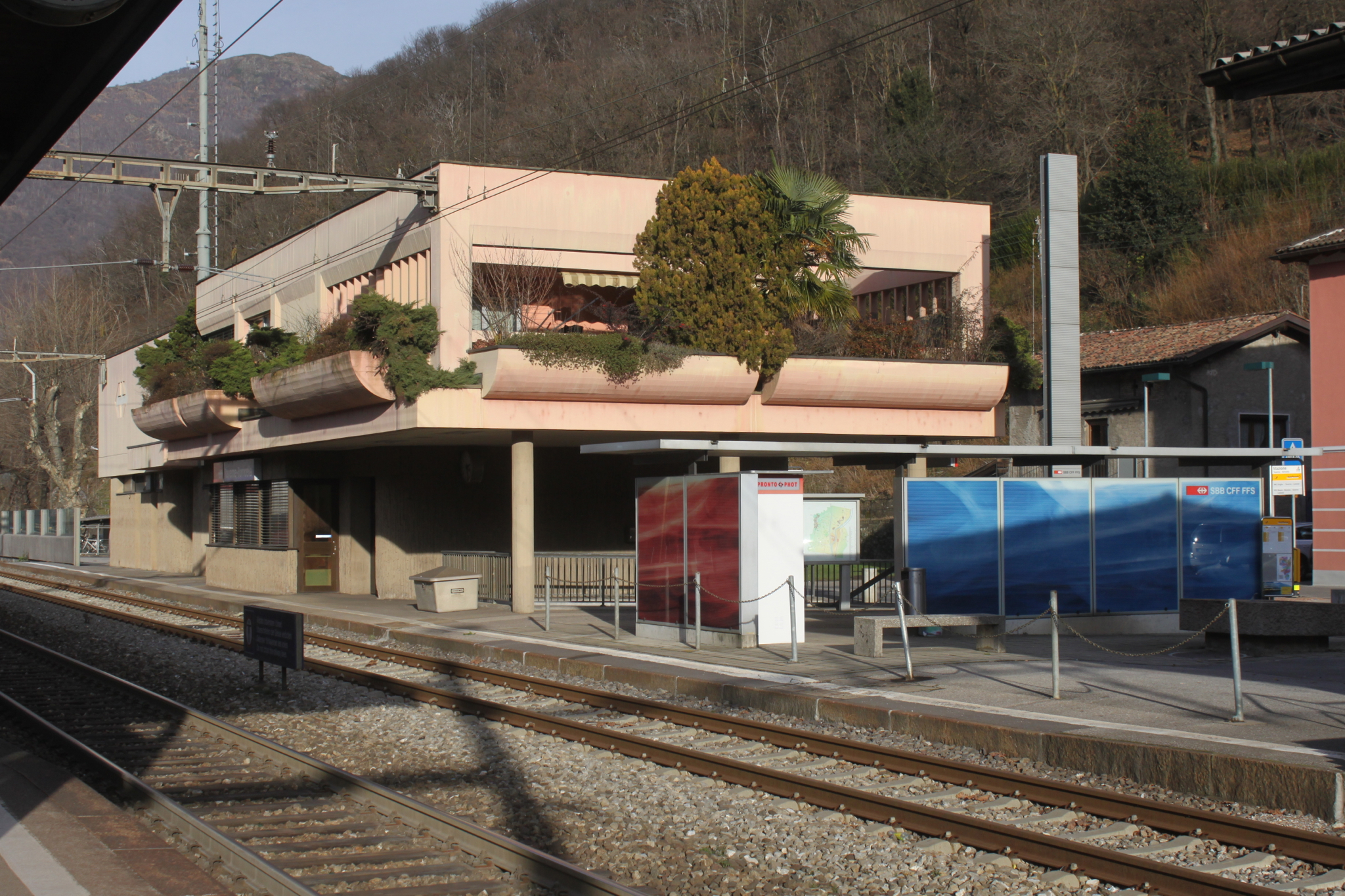
- The station building in 2014

General information
- Location: Via Serta; Torricella-Taverne; Switzerland
- Coordinates: 46°03′24″N 8°55′49″E
- Elevation: 335 m (1,099 ft)
- Owner: Swiss Federal Railways
- Line: Gotthard line
- Distance: 174.0 km (108.1 mi) from Immensee
- Train operators: Treni Regionali Ticino Lombardia
- Connections: Autopostale bus services

Services
Preceding station	TiLo	Following station
Mezzovico towards Giubiasco	S90	Lamone-Cadempino towards Mendrisio
Location

Taverne-Torricella railway station (Italian: Stazione di Taverne-Torricella) is a railway station in the Swiss canton of Ticino. The station is located on the border between the municipalities of Torricella-Taverne, Lamone and Bedano. The station is on the original line of the Swiss Federal Railways Gotthard railway between Bellinzona and Lugano. This line has been by-passed by the Ceneri Base Tunnel since 2020, and most trains between Lugano and Bellinzona now use the base tunnel rather than passing through Taverne-Torricella station.

The station is also the site of the junction for the freight-only branch to Lugano Vedeggio freight yard.

== Services ==
As of the December 2021 timetable change, the following services stop at Taverne-Torricella:

- S90: half-hourly between Giubiasco and Lugano and hourly service to Mendrisio.
