= Mezzovico railway station =

Railway station in Switzerland

Mezzovico
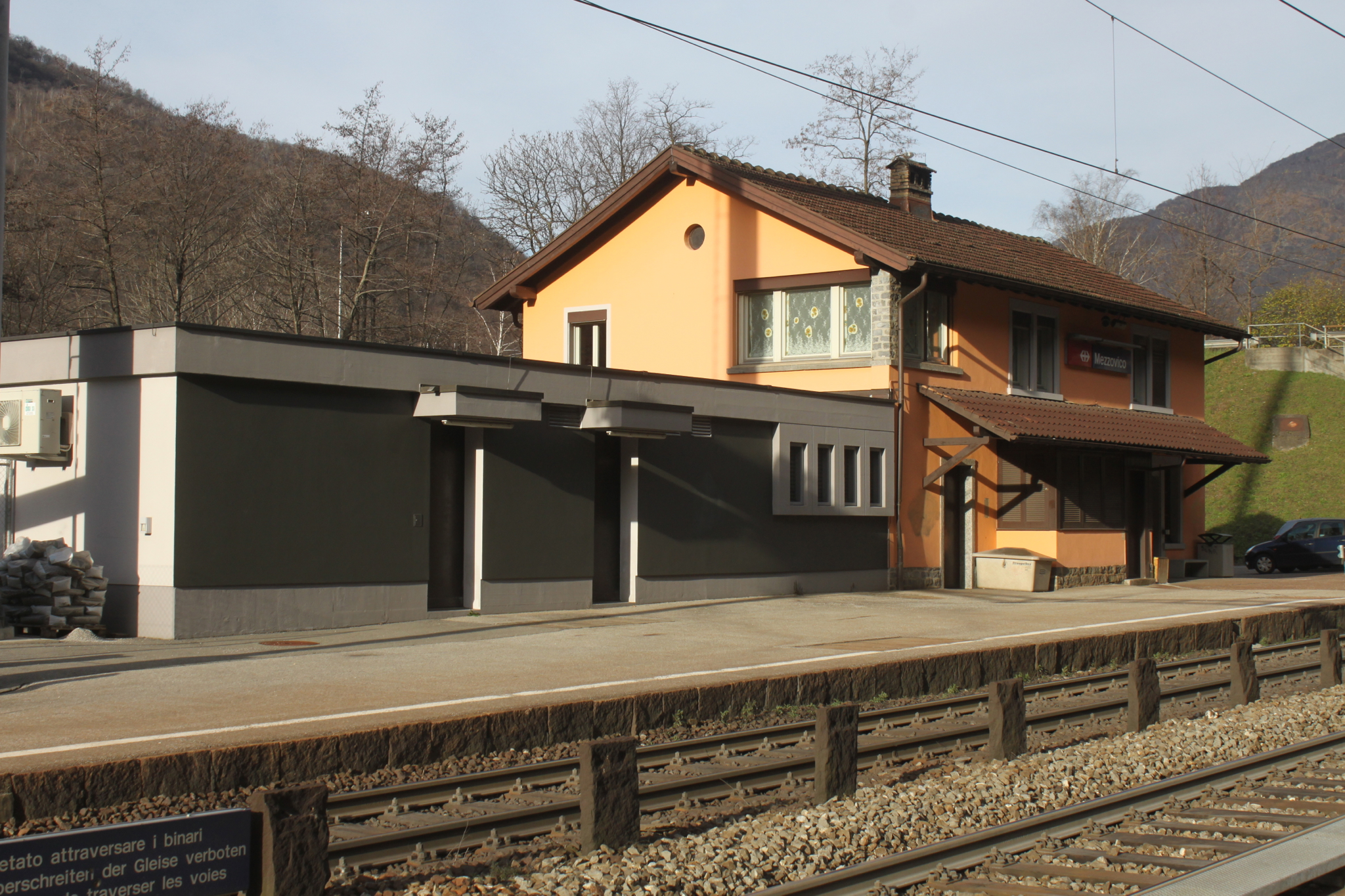
- The station building in 2014

General information
- Location: Via alla Stazion; Mezzovico-Vira; Switzerland
- Coordinates: 46°05′39″N 8°55′43″E
- Elevation: 416 m (1,365 ft)
- Owner: Swiss Federal Railways
- Line: Gotthard line
- Distance: 168.9 km (104.9 mi) from Immensee
- Train operators: Treni Regionali Ticino Lombardia
- Connections: Autopostale bus services

Services
Preceding station	TiLo	Following station
Rivera-Bironico towards Giubiasco	S90	Taverne-Torricella towards Mendrisio
Location

Mezzovico railway station (Italian: Stazione di Mezzovico) is a railway station in the Swiss canton of Ticino and municipality of Mezzovico-Vira. The station is on the original line of the Swiss Federal Railways Gotthard railway between Bellinzona and Lugano. This line has been by-passed by the Ceneri Base Tunnel since 2020, and most trains between Lugano and Bellinzona now use the base tunnel rather than passing through Mezzovico station.

== Services ==
As of the December 2021 timetable change, the following services stop at Mezzovico:

- S90: half-hourly between Giubiasco and Lugano and hourly service to Mendrisio.
