= Lamone-Cadempino railway station =

Railway station in Switzerland

Lamone-Cadempino
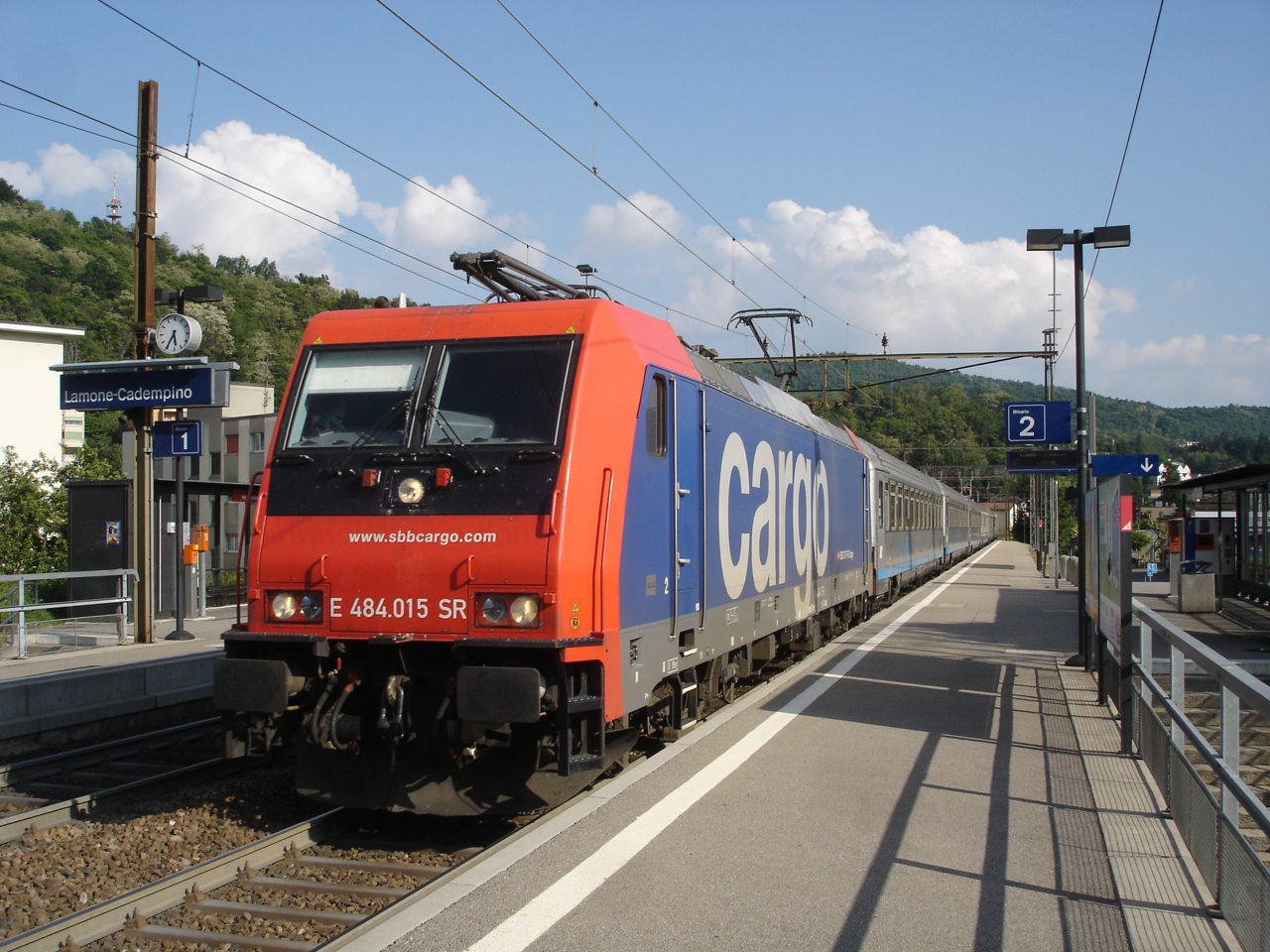
- An InterRegio train calling at the station in 2009

General information
- Location: Via Serta; Lamone; Switzerland
- Coordinates: 46°02′23″N 8°55′56″E
- Elevation: 318 m (1,043 ft)
- Owner: Swiss Federal Railways
- Line: Gotthard line
- Distance: 176.1 km (109.4 mi) from Immensee
- Train operators: Treni Regionali Ticino Lombardia
- Connections: ARL bus services; Autopostale bus services

Other information
- Fare zone: 110 (arcobaleno)

Passengers
- 2018: 2,900 per weekday

Services
| Preceding station | TiLo | Following station |
|---|---|---|
| Taverne-Torricella towards Giubiasco | S90 | Lugano towards Mendrisio |
Location

Lamone-Cadempino railway station (Italian: Stazione di Lamone-Cadempino) is a railway station in the Swiss canton of Ticino. The station is located on the border between the municipalities of Lamone and Cadempino, and serves both. The station is on the original line of the Swiss Federal Railways Gotthard railway between Bellinzona and Lugano. This line has been by-passed by the Ceneri Base Tunnel since 2020, and most trains between Lugano and Bellinzona now use the base tunnel rather than passing through Lamone-Cadempino station.

== Services ==
As of the December 2021 timetable change, the following services stop at Lamone-Cadempino:

- S90: half-hourly between Giubiasco and Lugano and hourly service to Mendrisio.
