= Mamelles Desalination Plant =

Desalination plant in Senegal

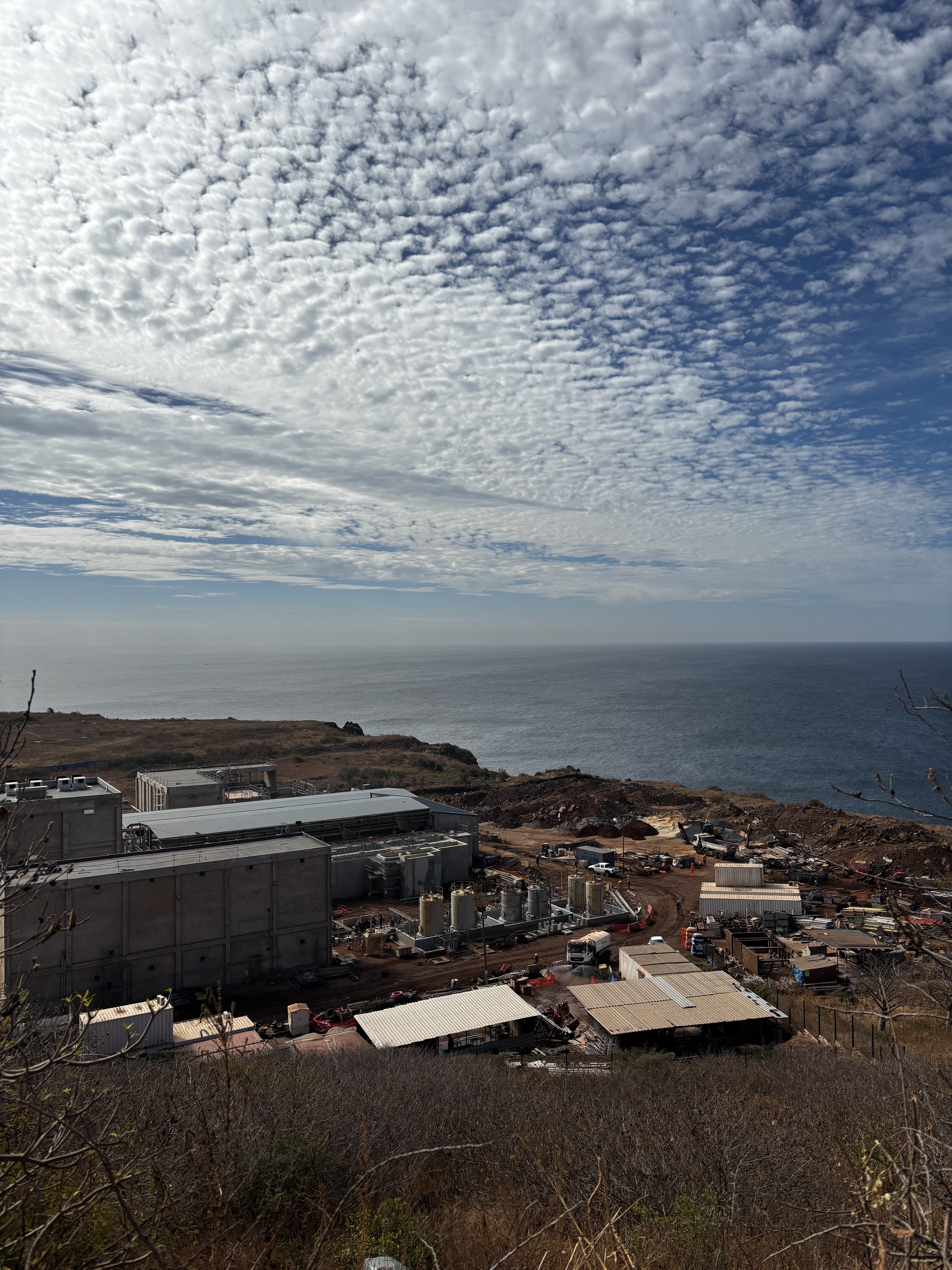
- The Mamelles Desalination Plant under construction

- Location within Senegal
- Interactive map of Mamelles Desalination Plant
- Location: Mamelles, Ouakam, Dakar
- Coordinates: 14°43′28″N 17°30′11″W
- Estimated output: 50,000 cubic meters (50,000,000 L) of water daily
- Extended output: 100,000 cubic meters (100,000,000 L) of water daily
- Cost: €200 million
- Technology: Reverse osmosis, Chlorination
- Percent of water supply: Estimated 50% of Dakar's Water Supply
- Operation date: 2025 Expected

The Mamelles Desalination Plant is a sea water desalination plant under construction in the city of Dakar in Senegal. The facility is under development by the government of Senegal, with financial support from the Japan International Cooperation Agency (JICA). The Senegalese national water company (Société Nationale des Eaux du Senegal), SONES, is developing the project on behalf on the Senegalese government, and the Japanese private company Nippon Koei, is developing the project, on behalf of JICA. Construction started in June 2022, at a budgeted cost of €200 million and an expected output of 50,000 cubic meters (50,000,000 L) of desalinated potable water every day in the first phase, expandable to 100,000 cubic meters (100,000,000 L) daily, in the second phase.

== Location ==
The desalination plant is located at Mamelles beach, in the commune of Ouakam, on the Atlantic Ocean coast, approximately 10 kilometres (6 mi) by road, northwest of the central business district of Dakar, the capital and largest city of Senegal.

== History ==
In 2020, SONES began laying pipes to transmit the desalinated potable water from the plant to a point in Dakar where the new water will enter the Dakar water distribution system. The pipe from Mamelles to Dakar measures between 10.4 kilometres (6 mi), and 13.5 kilometres (8 mi), in length. On 31 May 2022, the president of Senegal, Macky Sall, laid the foundation stone, to mark the beginning of construction of the desalination plant itself.

== Overview ==
According to JICA, the project is intended to "secure a sufficient amount of water supply to meet the future demand" of the city of Dakar and its metropolitan area. The population of some of the municipalities of the city are projected to expand by nearly 100 percent between 2020 and 2035.

Development of the project comprises the following components:

1. Constructing a seawater desalination plant, that uses the reverse osmosis desalination process, where two liters of sea water are taken in, producing one liter of drinkable water and a second liter of very salty water (brine), which is returned to the sea. A three-year operation and maintenance period is part of the EPC contract.

2. Laying of seawater intake pipes with a pumping mechanism to bring the seawater into the plant.

3. Laying of pipes, with an attached pumping mechanism to discharge the brine back into the sea.

4. Laying 10–15 kilometres (6–9 mi) of pipe mains, with attached pump(s), to carry the desalinated water into Dakar.

== Construction and timeline ==
The engineering, procurement and construction (EPC) contract was awarded to a consortium comprising (a) Toyota Tsusho Corporation (Toyota Tsusho) of Japan (b) Eiffage Génie Civil (Eiffage) of France and (c) VA Tech Wabag (Wabag) of India. Construction began in May 2022 and is expected to last until 2025.

VA Tech Wabag is responsible for engineering, procurement as well as operation and maintenance of the completed plant for the first twenty four months.

"This involves the design, engineering and supply of electromechanical equipment, supervision of installation and commissioning, followed by operation and maintenance of the plant for two years."

The construction works will be the responsibility of Eiffage Génie Civil and the project will be co-managed by Toyota Tsusho Corporation.

== Opposition ==
Groups of local fishermen, local seashore restaurateurs and local beachgoers, supported by local and foreign environmentalists are opposed to this development and are running a public relations campaign against it.

On its part JICA says the adverse outcomes are of negligible lasting effects, with the benefits outweighing the losses. The government of Senegal stated that it carried out "all the necessary studies to safeguard the marine ecosystem, the beach, and traditional sites".

== See also ==
- Desalination
- Jordan Desalination Plant
