= Helmut Mauell GmbH =

Bilfinger Berger Power Services
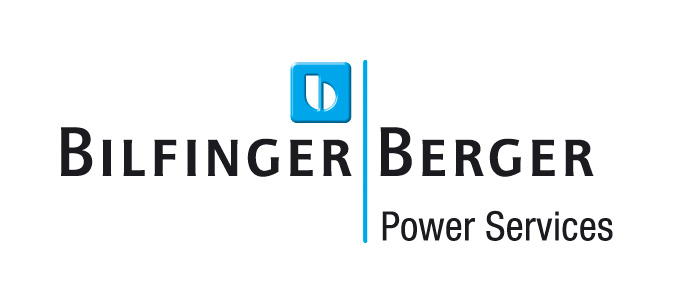
- Company type: GmbH
- Industry: Power
- Founded: August 2003
- Headquarters: Oberhausen, Germany
- Area served: Germany, Europe, Middle East, and South Africa
- Number of employees: 10,865 (2010)
- Parent: Bilfinger SE

Bilfinger Power Systems GmbH, based in Oberhausen, Germany, is one of five business divisions of the German multinational construction and services company Bilfinger SE.

== Business activities ==
Power Services primarily provides energy, environmental and pipeline technology. Bilfinger Berger also provides equipment such as steam generators and brine heaters as well as services including maintenance, installation, repair, power plant longevity assurance and power plant rehabilitation.

Bilfinger Berger Power Services focuses on construction, reconstruction and fabrication as well as providing spares and components to industrial plants, oil refineries and sewage treatment plants. A large percentage of these parts, such as pressure vessels and heat exchangers, are also fabricated on-demand from some of its regional manufacturing facilities.

At the end of the 2010 fiscal year, Bilfinger Berger Power Services employed approximately 7,400 specialized technicians, 3,200 administrative employees and 265 trainees.

== Subsidiary companies ==
A dense network of branches links the activities in the group's major markets: Germany, Europe, Middle East, and South Africa.

- Babcock Borsig Steinmueller GmbH
- Babcock Noell GmbH
- BHR Hochdruck-Rohrleitungsbau GmbH
- Bilfinger Berger Power Holdings (Pty) Ltd., South Africa
- Deutsche Babcock Middle East, United Arab Emirates
- Deutsche Babcock Al Jaber, Qatar
- Duro Dakovic Montaza d.d., Croatia
- MCE Berlin GmbH
- MCE Aschersleben GmbH
- MCE Machine and Equipment Construction GmbH & Co. KG
- Rosink Plant and Equipment GmbH
- Rotring Engineering GmbH

== History ==
Date	Milestone
08/2003	Deutsche Babcock AG buys Babcock Borsig Service Group from the bankruptcy of Babcock Borsig AG.
09/2003	Deutsche Babcock Al Jaber is established by Deutsche Babcock Middle East as joint-venture in Qatar.
12/2003	Babcock Borsig Service buys Steinmüller-Gesellschaft Steinmüller Engineering Service (Pty) Ltd.
01/2005	Acquisition of license for flue gas desulfurization by Babcock & Wilcox, USA.
04/2005	Bilfinger Berger AG acquires all shares in Babcock Borsig Service Group.
05/2006	Changed name from Deutsche Babcock GmbH to Bilfinger Berger Power Services GmbH
05/2006	Acquisition of BHR Hochdruck-Rohrleitungsbau GmbH.
04/2009	Acquisition of 80.5% stake in Croatian company Duro Dakovic Montaza d.d. (formerly of Đuro Đaković)
10/2010	Bilfinger Berger Power Services GmbH takes over Rotring Engineering AG.
02/2010	Acquisition of MCE Maschinen-und Apparatebau GmbH & Co. KG as part of the power services segment.
03/2010	Power services becomes a separate division within Bilfinger Berger AG.
09/2011	Acquisition of equipment Rosink Anlagen und Apparatenbau GmbH.
10/2011	Acquisition of the remaining shares of the Duro Dakovic Montaza dd (100%).

== See also ==
- Bilfinger Berger
- Babcock Borsig Service
- Deutsche Babcock Middle East
- Deutsche Babcock Al Jaber
