= Baulderstone =

Australian construction company

- Formerly: Baulderstone Hornibrook
- Industry: Construction
- Founded: 1926; 100 years ago
- Defunct: 2013; 13 years ago
- Headquarters: Sydney, Australia
- Area served: Australia
- Number of employees: 1,400 (December 2009)
- Parent: Lendlease
- Website: www.baulderstone.com.au

Baulderstone, formerly Baulderstone Hornibrook, was an Australian construction company.

== History ==
=== MR Hornibrook ===
In 1926, Manuel Hornibrook founded a construction company in Brisbane. Amongst its notable projects were the Story Bridge and William Jolly Bridge. In the 1970s, it built the Sydney Opera House.

=== AW Baulderstone ===
In 1946, Albert (Bert) William Baulderstone (born on 18 June 1906 in Longwood, Adelaide Hills) founded a construction company in Adelaide, South Australia. In 1984, Societe Auxiliaire d'Entreprises became a major shareholder in AW Baulderstone.

=== Baulderstone Hornibrook ===
In 1985 the two companies merged to form Baulderstone Hornibrook, with operations expanded overseas into Asia. In 1993 it was acquired by Bilfinger Berger. In October 2008 it was rebranded as Baulderstone. In December 2010 it was included in the sale of Bilfinger Berger Australia to Lendlease. The brand was retired in 2013 as part of a restructure of Lendlease's construction business units.

== Major projects ==
Major projects undertaken included:

- William Jolly Bridge, completed in 1932
- Story Bridge, completed in 1940
- Sydney Opera House, completed in 1973
- Emerson Crossing, completed in 1983
- Adelaide Convention Centre, completed in 1987
- State Bank Building, completed in 1988
- Anzac Bridge, completed in 1995
- Bolte Bridge, completed in 1999
- Mỹ Thuận Bridge, Vietnam, completed in 2000
- Docklands Stadium, completed in 2000
- Graham Farmer Freeway, completed in 2000
- Melbourne Museum, completed in 2000
- M5 Motorway East, completed in 2001
- Christmas Island Detention Centre, completed in 2003
- Cross City Tunnel, completed 2005
- Royal Women's Hospital, completed in 2008
- Phú Mỹ Bridge, Vietnam, completed in 2009
- Kurilpa Bridge, completed in 2009
- Clem Jones Tunnel, completed in 2010
- Southern Queensland Correctional Centre, completed in 2012
