= Abigroup =

Australian construction company

- Industry: Construction
- Founded: 1957
- Defunct: 2013
- Headquarters: Sydney, Australia
- Area served: Australia
- Number of employees: 2,100 (December 2009)
- Parent: Lendlease
- Website: www.abigroup.com.au

Abigroup was an Australian construction company.

== History ==
Abigroup was established as Graham Evans & Co in 1957 as a civil engineering company within New South Wales, being renamed Abignano in 1961. In 1981 it was listed on the Australian Securities Exchange. In 1984 Abignano acquired Enacon followed in 1987 by Robert Salzer Constructions.

In 1988, Abignano was renamed Abigroup following a management buyout and building company Hughes Bros was acquired. In 2004, Abigroup was acquired by Bilfinger Berger. In December 2010 it was included in the sale of Bilfinger Berger Australia to Lendlease. The brand was retired in 2013 as part of a restructure of Lendlease's construction business units.

== Major projects ==
Major projects undertaken included:

- M2 Hills Motorway, completed in 1997
- Sydney Olympic Park Hockey Centre, completed in 1998
- Sydney Super Dome, completed in 1999
- Sydney International Regatta Centre, completed in 2000
- Sydney Olympic Park Tennis Centre, completed in 2000
- Westlink M7, completed in 2005
- Port River Expressway, completed in 2008
- Gateway Bridge Duplication, completed in 2011
- Adelaide Desalination Plant, completed in 2012
- Ipswich Motorway, completed in 2012
- Peninsula Link, completed in 2013
- Queensland Children's Hospital, completed in 2014
