= Frutiger =

Frutiger may refer to:

- Adrian Frutiger, a Swiss typeface designer
- Frutiger Aero, a user interface design style and Internet aesthetic
- Frutiger AG, a Swiss construction company
- Frutiger (typeface), a typeface designed by the Swiss typeface designer Adrian Frutiger
