= Mezzovico-Vira =

- Municipality
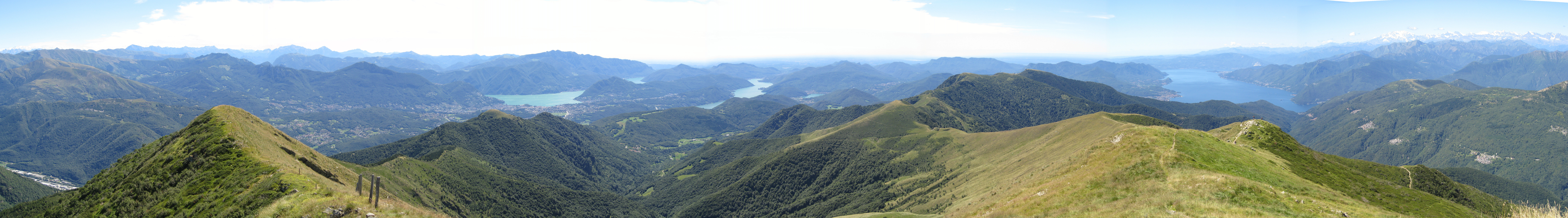

- Flag Coat of arms
- Location of Mezzovico-Vira
- Location within Switzerland Location within Canton of Ticino
- Coordinates: 46°6′N 8°55′E
- Country: Switzerland
- Canton: Ticino
- District: Lugano

Government
  - Mayor: Sindaco

Area
  - Total: 10.2 km^{2} (3.9 sq mi)
- Elevation: 460 m (1,510 ft)

Population (December 2004)
  - Total: 972
  - Density: 95.3/km^{2} (247/sq mi)
- Time zone: UTC+01:00 (CET)
  - Summer (DST): UTC+02:00 (CEST)
- Postal code: 6805
- SFOS number: 5199
- ISO 3166 code: CH-TI
- Surrounded by: Capriasca, Monteceneri
- Website: www.mezzovico-vira.ch

Mezzovico-Vira is a municipality in the district of Lugano in the canton of Ticino in Switzerland.

== History ==
A recently discovered stele with inscriptions in northern Etruscan suggests that the area around Mezzovico-Vira was already settled in the pre-Roman era. An archaeological investigation under the parish church of S. Abbondio in 1990, discovered Roman urn graves. The church developed from a small wooden church in the 6th century to the current baroque building.

In the Early Middle Ages it was a curtis, consisting of the villa (Vira), the vicus in the middle (Mezzovico) and the settlement of Sigirino. In the Middle Ages it belonged to the valley community of Carvina, which included the villages of the upper north end of Vedeggio. The modern municipality of Mezzovico-Vira is first mentioned in 1335 as Medio Vico and Vira.

The political and religious center of the valley was Bironico. Mezzovico and Vira were always one municipality, but separated religiously when the Church of San Antonio in Vira became a parish church in 1838. The parish church of Mezzovico, S. Mamete goes back to a Roman era building which was expanded in the 12th, 15th and 16th centuries.

Traditional agriculture in the village was based mainly on the use of mountain pastures. In the last decades of the 20th century; the motorway, the main road and the railway along with a number of buildings for industry and commerce were built in along the valley floor. This development is due to the growth of the agglomeration of Lugano, which spread into the Vedeggio valley, as well as the proximity to the motorway and the Swiss Federal Railways station at Rivera.

== Geography ==
Aerial view (1946)

Mezzovico-Vira has an area, as of 1997, of 10.21 square kilometers (3.94 sq mi). Of this area, 0.6 km^{2} (0.23 sq mi) or 5.9% is used for agricultural purposes, while 6.69 km^{2} (2.58 sq mi) or 65.5% is forested. Of the rest of the land, 0.85 km^{2} (0.33 sq mi) or 8.3% is settled (buildings or roads), 0.13 km^{2} (32 acres) or 1.3% is either rivers or lakes and 1.44 km^{2} (0.56 sq mi) or 14.1% is unproductive land.

Of the built up area, industrial buildings made up 2.8% of the total area while housing and buildings made up 2.3% and transportation infrastructure made up 2.9%. Out of the forested land, 53.7% of the total land area is heavily forested and 2.1% is covered with orchards or small clusters of trees. Of the agricultural land, 3.2% is used for growing crops and 2.3% is used for alpine pastures. All the water in the municipality is flowing water. Of the unproductive areas, 12.5% is unproductive vegetation and 1.6% is too rocky for vegetation.

The municipality is located in the Lugano district. It consists of two settlements along the old road to Monte Ceneri.

== Coat of arms ==
The blazon of the municipal coat of arms is Per pale argent a hemp plant vert fruited(?) or and azure a crozieror issuant from base behind an escutcheon argent a cross gules. The hemp (Italian: canapa) refers to the family Canepa, while the cross and shield are from the bishop Enrico Silvio (1556–1612).

== Demographics ==
Mezzovico-Vira has a population (as of December 2020) of 1,387. As of 2008, 12.2% of the population are resident foreign nationals. Over the last 10 years (1997–2007) the population has changed at a rate of 19%.

Most of the population (as of 2000) speaks Italian (87.0%), with German being second most common (7.8%) and French being third (1.9%). Of the Swiss national languages (as of 2000), 73 speak German, 18 people speak French, 816 people speak Italian. The remainder (31 people) speak another language.

As of 2008, the gender distribution of the population was 48.8% male and 51.2% female. The population was made up of 498 Swiss men (43.0% of the population), and 68 (5.9%) non-Swiss men. There were 527 Swiss women (45.5%), and 66 (5.7%) non-Swiss women.

In 2008 there were 9 live births to Swiss citizens and were 4 deaths of Swiss citizens. Ignoring immigration and emigration, the population of Swiss citizens increased by 5 while the foreign population remained the same. There were 2 Swiss men and 1 Swiss woman who immigrated back to Switzerland. At the same time, there was 1 non-Swiss man who immigrated from another country to Switzerland. The total Swiss population change in 2008 (from all sources, including moves across municipal borders) was an increase of 18 and the non-Swiss population change was an increase of 2 people. This represents a population growth rate of 1.8%.

The age distribution, as of 2009, in Mezzovico-Vira is; 133 children or 11.5% of the population are between 0 and 9 years old and 128 teenagers or 11.0% are between 10 and 19. Of the adult population, 104 people or 9.0% of the population are between 20 and 29 years old. 174 people or 15.0% are between 30 and 39, 230 people or 19.8% are between 40 and 49, and 143 people or 12.3% are between 50 and 59. The senior population distribution is 107 people or 9.2% of the population are between 60 and 69 years old, 83 people or 7.2% are between 70 and 79, there are 57 people or 4.9% who are over 80.

As of 2000, there were 367 private households in the municipality, and an average of 2.4 persons per household. In 2000 there were 317 single family homes (or 81.7% of the total) out of a total of 388 inhabited buildings. There were 53 two family buildings (13.7%) and 2 multi-family buildings (0.5%). There were also 16 buildings in the municipality that were multipurpose buildings (used for both housing and commercial or another purpose).

The vacancy rate for the municipality, in 2008, was 0.57%. In 2000 there were 466 apartments in the municipality. The most common apartment size was the 4 room apartment of which there were 142. There were 31 single room apartments and 137 apartments with five or more rooms. Of these apartments, a total of 365 apartments (78.3% of the total) were permanently occupied, while 95 apartments (20.4%) were seasonally occupied and 6 apartments (1.3%) were empty. As of 2007, the construction rate of new housing units was 4.6 new units per 1000 residents.

The historical population is given in the following chart:

== Heritage sites of national significance ==
The Church of S. Mamete and Oratory of S. Ambrogio are listed as Swiss heritage site of national significance.

== Politics ==
In the 2007 federal election the most popular party was the CVP which received 37.64% of the vote. The next three most popular parties were the Ticino League (18.48%), the FDP (18.39%) and the SP (12.91%). In the federal election, a total of 419 votes were cast, and the voter turnout was 57.0%.

In the 2007 Gran Consiglio election, there were a total of 733 registered voters in Mezzovico-Vira, of which 551 or 75.2% voted. 9 blank ballots were cast, leaving 542 valid ballots in the election. The most popular party was the PPD+GenGiova which received 166 or 30.6% of the vote. The next three most popular parties were; the SSI (with 105 or 19.4%), the LEGA (with 99 or 18.3%) and the PLRT (with 97 or 17.9%).

In the 2007 Consiglio di Stato election, 7 blank ballots were cast, leaving 544 valid ballots in the election. The most popular party was the PPD which received 148 or 27.2% of the vote. The next three most popular parties were; the LEGA (with 140 or 25.7%), the PLRT (with 92 or 16.9%) and the SSI (with 81 or 14.9%).

== Economy ==
As of 2007, Mezzovico-Vira had an unemployment rate of 3.48%. As of 2005, there were 23 people employed in the primary economic sector and about 6 businesses involved in this sector. 1,508 people were employed in the secondary sector and there were 39 businesses in this sector. 390 people were employed in the tertiary sector, with 61 businesses in this sector. There were 441 residents of the municipality who were employed in some capacity, of which females made up 38.3% of the workforce.

In 2000, there were 1,934 workers who commuted into the municipality and 304 workers who commuted away. The municipality is a net importer of workers, with about 6.4 workers entering the municipality for every one leaving. About 26.0% of the workforce coming into Mezzovico-Vira are coming from outside Switzerland, while 0.3% of the locals commute out of Switzerland for work. Of the working population, 9.8% used public transportation to get to work, and 68.5% used a private car.

== Religion ==
From the 2000 census, 800 or 85.3% were Roman Catholic, while 64 or 6.8% belonged to the Swiss Reformed Church. There are 51 individuals (or about 5.44% of the population) who belong to another church (not listed on the census), and 23 individuals (or about 2.45% of the population) did not answer the question.

== Education ==
In Mezzovico-Vira about 74.7% of the population (between age 25-64) have completed either non-mandatory upper secondary education or additional higher education (either university or a Fachhochschule).

In Mezzovico-Vira there were a total of 225 students (as of 2009). The Ticino education system provides up to three years of non-mandatory kindergarten and in Mezzovico-Vira there were 42 children in kindergarten. The primary school program lasts for five years and includes both a standard school and a special school. In the municipality, 76 students attended the standard primary schools and 4 students attended the special school. In the lower secondary school system, students either attend a two-year middle school followed by a two-year pre-apprenticeship or they attend a four-year program to prepare for higher education. There were 54 students in the two-year middle school and 1 in their pre-apprenticeship, while 13 students were in the four-year advanced program.

The upper secondary school includes several options, but at the end of the upper secondary program, a student will be prepared to enter a trade or to continue on to a university or college. In Ticino, vocational students may either attend school while working on their internship or apprenticeship (which takes three or four years) or may attend school followed by an internship or apprenticeship (which takes one year as a full-time student or one and a half to two years as a part-time student). There were 10 vocational students who were attending school full-time and 23 who attend part-time.

The professional program lasts three years and prepares a student for a job in engineering, nursing, computer science, business, tourism and similar fields. There were 2 students in the professional program.

As of 2000, there were 2 students in Mezzovico-Vira who came from another municipality, while 72 residents attended schools outside the municipality.

== Transport ==
Mezzovico-Vira is served by the Mezzovico station, on the Gotthard railway.
