= VA Tech (disambiguation) =

VA Tech is an informally used unofficial name for Virginia Tech (Virginia Polytechnic Institute and State University), in Blacksburg, Virginia.

VA Tech may also refer to:

- VA Tech Hydro, a subsidiary of the Austrian industrial processesing group Andritz AG
- VA Tech Wabag, a company with headquarters in Austria and India
- VA Technologie, an Austrian company taken over by Siemens AG in 2005

== See also ==
- Virginia Tech shooting, the shooting on the Virginia Tech campus on April 16, 2007
