= Valemus =

Former Australian holding company

- Formerly: Bilfinger Berger Australia
- Industry: Construction, Civil engineering
- Founded: 2004
- Defunct: 2011
- Headquarters: Sydney, Australia
- Key people: Nick Greiner (Chairman); Peter Brecht (CEO)
- Revenue: $4.8 billion (2009)
- Number of employees: 6,800 (2009)
- Parent: Bilfinger
- Subsidiaries: Abigroup; Baulderstone; Conneq
- Website: www.bbau.com.au

Valemus (formerly Bilfinger Berger Australia) was a holding company that owned the Australian assets of Bilfinger.

== History ==
Valemus was established in 2004 as Bilfinger Berger Australia (BBA), as the holding company of Bilfinger's investments in Australia. BBA had acquired Baulderstone Hornibrook in 1993 and Abigroup in 2004. Bilfinger Berger Services was established in November 2005 by transferring the services businesses owned by Abigroup and Baulderstone to a new services focused company.

Having changed its name to Valemus, in June 2010, a prospectus was issued with the aim of listing the company on the Australian Securities Exchange via an initial public offering. In July 2010 the listing was abandoned with a trade sale to Lendlease agreed in December 2010 and completed in March 2011 after the Australian Competition & Consumer Commission decided not to oppose the sale.
