= Jordan Desalination Plant =

Desalination Plant in Jordan

- Location within Jordan
- Interactive map of Jordan Desalination Plant
- Location: Aqaba, Aqaba Governorate
- Coordinates: 29°27′19″N 34°58′22″E
- Estimated output: 250,000,000 cubic meters (2.5×10^{11} L) of water per year
- Daily capacity: 851,000 m³/day
- Cost: €4 billion Estimate
- Energy generation offset: Solar power plant
- Technology: Reverse osmosis, Chlorination
- Percent of water supply: Estimated 25% of Jordan's Water Supply
- Operation date: 2030 or 2031 Expected

Jordan Desalination Plant (Arabic: محطة تحلية مياه الأردن) is a planned sea water desalination plant in the city of Aqaba in Jordan. The facility is under development by the government of Jordan, with the aim of narrowing the water deficit in the country. Bids for the engineering, procurement and construction (EPC) contract were advertised. In June 2021, thirteen international consortia responded and five of them were shortlisted to advance to the next bidding stage. Construction of the desalination plant is budgeted at approximately US$1 billion and is expected to take approximately five years. In January 2025, a consortium led by Meridiam and SUEZ won a major contract, signing a 30-year concession agreement with the Jordanian government to develop the world's second-largest desalination plant and a 445 km pipeline network to supply the cities of Amman and Aqaba.

The reverse osmosis plant will have a capacity of 851,000 m^{3} per day. Upon completion, it is projected to supply 3 million people, 40 percent of the country's drinking water demand. The €4 billion project is jointly supported by the U.S. International Development Finance Corporation (DFC), the U.S. Agency for International Development (USAID) in Amman, the European Union, and multiple international financial institutions. Thus, the project funding adheres to strict environmental and social safeguards. To offset energy demands, a 724 GWh/year solar power plant will be built, aligning with sustainability commitments.

== Location ==
The desalination plant would be located in the sea-side city of Aqaba, in Aqaba Governorate, on the shores of the Gulf of Aqaba, a part of the Red Sea, in extreme southern Jordan. Aqaba, the only coastal city in Jordan, is located approximately 333 kilometres (207 mi) south of Amman, the capital and largest city in the country.

== Overview ==
The Kingdom of Jordan, with a population of 10 million people, is one of the world's most water-stressed countries. As of September 2021, the country needed approximately 1,300,000,000 cubic metres (1.3×10^{12} L) of potable water annually. However, at that time only 850,000,000–900,000,000 cubic metres (8.5×10^{11}–9.0×10^{11} L) was available. The shortage was attributed to poor rains, climate change, a ballooning population and a high refugee influx.

To mitigate its water shortfall, the Jordanian government opened a desalination plant in 2017. The plant is referred to as the Aqaba Desalination Plant. The facility produces 5,000,000 cubic metres (5.0×10^{9} L) of potable water annually distributed to homes, industry, and agriculture in the Aqaba area. At that time a bigger project, the Red Sea–Dead Sea Water Conveyance (RSDSC), a collaborative effort between Israel, Jordan and the Palestinian Authority was in the plans.

In June 2021, after years of delay and lack of commitment from the other stakeholders, the Jordanian government abandoned the RSDSC project and focused on this desalination plant project. Seawater will be extracted from the Red Sea and conveyed via intake pipelines to a desalination plant in Aqaba. The purified water will be pumped via pipeline to Amman and points north. The effluent brine will also be piped north via a discharge pipeline and deposited into the Dead Sea, whose levels have been falling in recent years.

== Other considerations ==
The brine pumped into the Dead Sea is expected to support a hydroelectric power station, with the installation of electric generators in its path.

Until this desalination plant reaches commercial commissioning, Jordan continues to purchase 100,000,000 cubic metres (1.0×10^{11} L) of potable water annually from Israel, under previous peace accords between the two countries.

== See also ==
- Desalination
- Water supply and sanitation in Jordan
- Mamelles Desalination Plant
