= Babcock Borsig Service =

Babcock Borsig Service GmbH
- Company type: Subsidiary
- Industry: Power Engineering, Construction, Services
- Founded: 1970
- Headquarters: Oberhausen, Germany
- Key people: Gerd Lesser, Alexander Neubauer
- Revenue: € 203 Million (GmbH), € 384 Million (Gruppe)
- Number of employees: 1580 (GmbH) 2800 (Group)
- Parent: Bilfinger Berger
- Website: Official website

Babcock Borsig Service GmbH (BBS GmbH) is the parent company of Babcock Borsig Service Group. BBS GmbH is an international service provider in the energy-producing industry, with around 2,800 employees.

== History ==
In 1970 Deutsche Babcock bought the company Borsig AG; therefore, years later the company name changed to Babcock Borsig AG.

Since 2005, the Babcock Borsig Service Group is a subsidiary company of Bilfinger Berger AG. Before the integration some branches were established abroad, just like Deutsche Babcock Middle East and also some joint-ventures, as Deutsche Babcock Al Jaber.

After this integration, the BBS GmbH – as all its subsidiaries, branches and joint-ventures – operates since May 2006 under the umbrella
of the Bilfinger Berger Power Services (BBPS GmbH).

In addition to the GmbH is a number of subsidiaries belonging to the Group. The main companies are Steinmüller, Babcock Noell and Babcock Borsig Power Holding.

== Business activity ==
The Bilfinger Berger Power Services division deals with maintenance, service, efficiency enhancement and lifetime extension and the supply of components. The BBPS GmbH provides services for conventional and nuclear power plants, environmental and water treatment plants, mining and other industries such as waste incineration, chemical and petrochemical industries, steel mills, and research centers of particle physics, nuclear fusion and nuclear engineering.

== See also ==
- Bilfinger Berger
- Deutsche Babcock
- Bilfinger Berger Power Services
- Deutsche Babcock Middle East
- Deutsche Babcock Al Jaber
