= Deutsche Babcock =

Former German manufacturing company

Deutsche Babcock & Wilcox Dampfkessel Werke Aktien-Gesellschaft
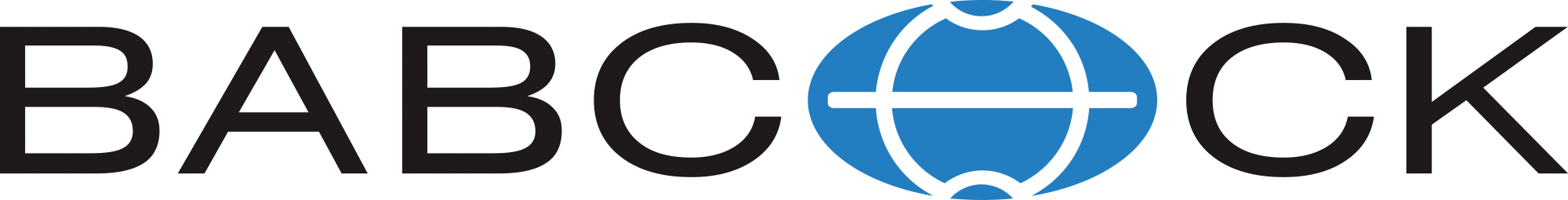
- Logo since 1975
- Trade name: Deutsche Babcock AG
- Industry: Manufacturing
- Founded: 1898; 128 years ago
- Defunct: 2002
- Parent: Babcock & Wilcox, Limited (1898-1975)

Share of the Deutsche Babcock & Wilcox-Dampfkessel-Werke AG, issued 22 April 1909

Deutsche Babcock AG (full name: Deutsche Babcock & Wilcox-Dampfkessel-Werke Aktiengesellschaft) was a German manufacturing company based in Oberhausen in the Ruhr District, the center of the German economy. The company was established in 1898 as a German subsidiary of the British boilermaking company Babcock & Wilcox, Limited. In the beginning of the 20th century and the interwar period Deutsche Babcock expanded its business across the German Empire and the countries of Eastern Europe and, to a lesser extent, Scandinavian countries. Financial success and military conflicts between Germany and the United Kingdom led to de facto independence of Deutsche Babcock from its British parent, although the British owned the controlling interest in Deutsche Babcock until 1975.

After World War II Deutsche Babcock controlled the West German market for industrial steam boilers and nuclear power equipment. It diversified into oil and gas firing equipment, nuclear fuel, reprocessing components, air conditioning systems, refrigeration equipment, specialty steels and wire, copper pipes, cast-iron fittings, desulfurization systems, and water-treatment plants. In 1996 the company experienced a severe crisis and was reorganized into Babcock Borsig. In 2002 the second crisis forced disbandment of Babcock Borsig and sale of its industrial assets to independent buyers. At the time of the company's failure it had 13,000 employees in Germany and 9,000 in other countries. As of July 2010, Babcock Borsig still exists as a shell company.

== History ==
=== Formation ===
The American boilermaking company Babcock & Wilcox, established in 1866, set up their first overseas operation in London in 1881. In 1891 the American shareholders sold the majority of their interest in the UK operations to the public. The parent company retained control over their intellectual property in the United States and Cuba. The new independent British company, Babcock & Wilcox Limited, assumed control over the Babcock & Wilcox patents and licenses in the rest of the world. It had already established itself in Western Europe, Australia and the Middle East.

The British Babcock & Wilcox Limited entered the German market in 1887 through licensing of its technology and brand to a local manufacturer, Schwartzkopff. By the middle of the 1890s the British became dissatisfied with apparently low volume of business: their German licensee "had too much else to attend to". Direct operations in Germany were ruled out in fear of the strong anti-British sentiment among the Germans. Instead, in 1898 Babcock & Wilcox Limited formed a German subsidiary company, Deutsche Babcock & Wilcox-Dampfkessel-Werke Aktiengesellschaft (Deutsche Babcock & Wilcox, DB&W). Robert Jurenka and Alois Seidle from Bohemia signed an agreement with Babcock & Wilcox to convert their Berlin sales office into a fully operational subsidiary. Babcock & Wilcox Limited granted DB&W an exclusive license to sell Babcock & Wilcox products in Germany and its colonies. The British parent retained majority ownership and representation in the board of directors of DB&W.

=== Expansion ===
Jurenka and Seidle bought a boilermaking factory in Oberhausen in the Ruhr District and started manufacturing with mere thirty employees. In 1909 Deutsche Babcock added a factory in Gleiwitz to make steam generators. By 1927, the company had 1600 employees. The company has been continuously profitable and always paid dividends until (at least) 1939. Jurenka led Deutsch Babcock until his death in 1942. He was responsible for a company culture that was unusual for its time. The company offered health insurance from the start, a five-day workweek prior to 1914, 42 1/2 hour workweeks by 1930, and pensions for retirees starting in 1938.

After the end of World War I Deutsche Babcock engaged in a conflict with its parent company. The war had already terminated the ties between British and German businesses. DB&W acquired substantial market shares in Scandinavia, the Netherlands and the Baltic countries, which had formerly been a "British territory". The German management, riding high on the wave of continuously strong financials, openly contested their British parent's rights to these market and asserted de facto independence of DB&W. The parent company abstained from resuming active control, fearing that a conflict will destroy the market value of their investment. The conflict was resolved in the 1920 contract that largely upheld the German interests. DB&W received exclusive rights for Central and Eastern Europe, including the Baltic States; the British took over the Scandinavia. Poland was split between the British and German companies. The agreement set the vector for DB&W expansion: unlike many companies, Deutsche Babcock expanded its operations to the east, not to the west.

Throughout the interwar period DB&W expanded their markets at the expense of the British parent. They made deals with clients in Scandinavia and Soviet Russia, and openly competed with the British in Poland. In 1932, when most of the original Babcock & Wilcox patents had expired and the economies were suffering from the Great Depression, Jurenka demanded complete abolition of license fees and royalties. Establishment of the Nazi regime made DB&W bargaining position stronger, and in 1939 their British parent reluctantly recognized the right of DB&W management to enter contracts without consulting the British office. Numerous attempts by the British management to improve group-wide collaboration "made little impression on its German subsidiary."

=== Post-war recovery ===
After taking over the company during World War II, Robert Jantscha faced numerous challenges. The Oberhausen plant was bombed, Silesia became part of Poland, and the Soviet Union imposed Communism throughout much of the area where Deutsche Babcock operated. The company succeeded, though, by changing its focus to agricultural machinery and building a new plant in Friedrichsfeld, on a site purchased in 1921.

After World War II the British parent company assumed control over the board of DB&W. In 1954 the British confirmed the exclusive rights of DB&W for Central and Eastern Europe and the future United Germany. The European subsidiaries of Babcock & Wilcox temporarily united with a common goal of post-war recovery and transfer of technologies. However, in 1959 the fragile union was weakened by a conflict between European and American interests in nuclear powerplant construction. DB&W, which possessed unique technology of making oversized boilers, led the opposition to the transfer of European technology to the Americans.

By 1960, Deutsche Babcock had 11,000 employees and made 150 products. In 1961, Germany's first nuclear-powered ship, NS Otto Hahn, used a reactor made by Deutsche Babcock. The company also worked on a power plant for Nordwestdeutsche Kraftwerke in 1963, using an advanced gas-cooled reactor developed by the British company. This development showed Deutsche Babcock to be a major player in making West Germany a leading industrial nation. In 1971, Deutsche Babcock, the American Babcock & Wilcox, and Brown Boveri teamed up to compete with the Kraftwerk Union formed by AEG and Siemens. The nuclear power industry appeared headed for major growth until the Three Mile Island incident in the United States.

As of 1972, Deutsche Babcock supplied 56 percent of West Germany's boiler market. After Jantscha died in 1967, Hans Ewaldsen took the company into an era of acquisitions. By 1980, there were almost 80 subsidiaries, about half in countries other than West Germany. In 1981 Deutsche Babcock ranked 38th largest West German company, with annual sales just below 5 billion marks and 31,187 employees.

In 1975 the British company decided its profits from the German operation were too low and sold the government of Iran its holdings amounting to a fourth of the stock and 33.92% of the voting rights for 150 million dollars. Acquisition of 25.01% share of Krupp by Iran led to de facto merger of Deutsche Babcock and EVT GmbH, a Krupp subsidiary and the main competitor to Deutsche Babcock. After the 1979 Iranian Revolution the shareholding in Krupp and Deutsche Babcock remained the largest Iranian investments in Germany. During the Iran hostage crisis they were temporarily seized by Morgan Guaranty as a lien securing the repayment of Iranian debt. Later, Iran recovered control over its investment and held it until 1986, when it sold to a group of German banks.

=== Decline ===
A freeze on new nuclear plants in West Germany, a decline in new power plant construction overall, currency problems in Kuwait, and difficulty competing with foreign firms in the boiler industry led to some down years for the company. Still, Deutsche Babcock built a number of plants in the Middle East despite the Iran–Iraq War. The decline in nuclear power and a return to coal actually created a new area of business—pollution control. Deutsch Babcock also branched out into improvement in water quality and soil quality, and environmental engineering went from a tenth of the company's business in 1983 to a fourth in 1988. Helmut Wiehn became president as the company began its comeback.

The fall of Communism led to new markets in Eastern Europe, and agreements with companies in Czechoslovakia and the former Soviet Union resulted.

In 1995, Deutsche Babcock lost 8.7 million marks and expected to lose 400 million marks in 1996 when the company's banks agreed to provide 500 million marks (about US$327 million) for reorganisation.

== Babcock Borsig: the final years ==
In 1970 Deutsche Babcock bought the company Borsig AG. Years later the company's name changed to Babcock Borsig AG.

In March 2002, Babcock Borsig sold its one-quarter share of the Howaldtswerke-Deutsche Werft shipyard, which analysts said made the company's problems worse. In July, Babcock Borsig became the fourth German company to go under that year, symbolizing the weakness of the German economy and threatening Gerhard Schröder's chances for re-election as chancellor. Babcock-Borsig filed for protection from creditors on 4 July, hoping to withdraw if financing could be found. The government of North Rhine-Westphalia offered 800 million euros (a third of that from the national government), but Deutsche Bank, Commerzbank and other creditors did not reach an agreement. The company's stock fell from 12 euros at the start of 2002 to just under one euro on 9 July.

Babcock Borsig Service Group, which maintains and upgrades fossil fuel power plants in Europe, Africa and parts of Asia, received an investment in Autumn 2003 from Deutsche Beteiligungs AG, which intended to find a partner. In April 2005, Bilfinger Berger bought all shares of Babcock Borsig Service Group from Deutsche Beteiligungs.

The North American operations of Babcock Borsig AG now belong to Babcock Power Inc. of Danvers, Massachusetts, United States.

== See also ==
- Babcock Borsig Service
- Bilfinger Berger
