= VA Tech Wabag =

Indian water treatment company

VA Tech Wabag Ltd
- Type: Public
- Traded as: NSE: WABAG; BSE: 533269
- ISIN: INE956G01038
- Industry: Water and Waste-water treatment
- Founded: 1924
- Founder: Max Reder
- Headquarters: Chennai, India
- Key people: Rajiv Mittal (Chairman & Managing Director)
- Products: Drinking water treatment; Industrial and process water treatment; Sea and brackish water desalination; Municipal wastewater treatment; Industrial wastewater treatment; Sludge treatment
- Services: Engineering Procurement Construction & Commissioning (EPCC), Operation and maintenance (O&M)
- Revenue: ▲₹25.6 billion (US$270 million) (2020)
- Net income: ▲₹0.91 billion (US$9.4 million) (2020)
- Website: wabag.com

VA Tech Wabag Ltd. is an Indian multinational company focussed on desalination and water treatment for municipal and industrial users. Founded in Breslau in 1924, the company is headquartered in Chennai.

== History ==
=== Wabag ===
In 1924, Max Reder started Wabag Wasserfilter-Bau AG in Breslau, German Empire (now Wrocław, Poland). Deutsche Babcock became majority shareholder of Wabag in 1973 and eventually took over the entire company.

Julius Overhoff's water treatment company, founded in 1930, became part of Austrian Simmering-Graz-Pauker (SGP) AG in 1987.

In 1989, SGP's Energy and Environmental Technology Division and VA Finalindustrie merged, becoming SGP VA Energie- und Umwelttechnik, which merged in 1992 with Environmental Technology Division of Waagner Biro AG to form Austrian Energy & Environment SGP/Waagner Biro GmbH, the biggest energy firm in Austria. In 1996, Austrian Energy bought Tetra Industrietechnik and the environmental business of Sulzer Chemtech AG, and in 1997, Austrian Energy bought the reverse osmosis desalinization unit of Elin Energieversorgung and 70 percent of the shares of Puraqua shares from Energie Steirmark. VA Tech/Austrian Energy bought the remaining 30 percent of Puraqua in 1999.

During the 1990s, Wabag Kulmbach started a Leipzig subsidiary, purchased Water Engineering, Ltd., a British company, and the Belgian company STEP including a Tunisia branch, and bought an interest in AEW ESMIL. Also in the 1990s, Wabag added Salzburg and Brno branches.

=== VA Tech Wabag ===
In 1999, VA Technologie (a spinoff from VOEST Alpine) acquired the Wabag Group of Deutsche Babcock, taking over that company's water business. With this purchase, Austrian Energy & Environment became VA Tech Wabag GmbH. VA Tech Wabag Ltd. was formed in 2000, after the Madras High Court approved separating the operations other than water from Balcke Dürr & Wabag Technologies Ltd., whose India operations began in 1995.

On 14 July 2005, the European Commission approved an offer by Siemens AG Österreich for 97.15 of VA Technologie AG for about one billion euros.

In 2004, the metallurgy, power transmission and distribution and infrastructure units, which became part of Siemens, totalled 3 billion euros. These units, employing about 13,000, added to Siemens' significant presence in Austria. The acquisition gave Siemens potential growth in Eastern Europe.

VAI became part of the Siemens Industrial Solutions and Services Group (I&S), headquartered in Erlangen, Germany, though the VAI unit would operate separately with a Linz, Austria headquarters. VAI had dealt with technical solutions for building plants for iron, steel and aluminum, while Siemens made electrotechnical equipment. Both areas would be in one company as a result of the merger.

The VA Tech power transmission and distribution unit became part of the Siemens Power Transmission and Distribution Group, headquartered in Erlangen.

The infrastructure business (VA Tech Elin EBG and ai informatics) made Siemens "the largest Austrian provider of electrotechnical equipment, systems and services for industry, building and communal infrastructure, and for IT services".

A squeeze out was planned, with VA Tech being delisted.

Because of antitrust concerns, Siemens had to sell VA Tech's power generation unit, which had 2004 sales of 900 million euros and about 3000 employees. Andritz AG bought the hydroelectric power division in 2006 for an estimated 200 million euros. The VA Tech Hydro unit changed its name to Andritz VA Tech Hydro GmbH and became a subsidiary of Andritz AG. Also in 2005, Rajiv Mittal headed a management group along with ICICI Venture bought out the Chennai-based VA Tech India, a VA Tech Wabag GmbH subsidiary started in 1996. In 2007, VA Tech India acquired the erstwhile Austrian parent from Siemens for about $100 million. The deal was completed 6 November 2007.

In 2008, Wabag Water Services SRL in Ploiești, Romania and Wabag Water Services Limited in Macau were incorporated.

In 2009, Mittal's management team owned 38 percent, and ICICI owned 31 percent, of VA Tech Wabag. The company incorporated a China subsidiary.

In 2010, Va Tech Wabag was listed in the Indian stock exchanges - National Stock Exchange (NSE) and Bombay Stock Exchange (BSE).
