= Valid Time Event Code =

National Weather Service code

Valid Time Event Code (VTEC) is a code used by the National Weather Service, a part of National Oceanic and Atmospheric Administration (NOAA) of the United States government, to identify products / events.
