= Frutiger AG =

Company in Switzerland

Frutiger Group
- Native name: Frutiger AG
- Company type: Private
- Industry: Construction
- Founded: 1869; 157 years ago in Thun, Switzerland
- Founder: Johann Frutiger
- Key people: Luc Frutiger (Co-CEO); Thomas Frutiger (Co-CEO); Heinrich Spoerry
- Revenue: CHF 802 millions (2021)
- Number of employees: 2,600 (2021)
- Website: www.frutiger.ch

Frutiger AG, commonly referred to as Frutiger Group (en: Frutiger Ltd), is a Swiss civil engineering, procurement, construction and real estate company headquartered in Thun, Switzerland. Frutiger is the third largest construction company in Switzerland after Implenia and Marti Holding. In 2021, Frutiger had an annual turnover of CHF 802 millions and over 2,600 employees. Most prominently Frutiger forms part of the Transco consortium responsible for the Sedrun work site of the Gotthard Base Tunnel. Other companies involved in the project include Bilfinger SE, Implenia and Impresa Pizzarotti.

== History ==
Frutiger was founded in 1869 in Oberhofen, Switzerland, by Johann Frutiger. After his death in 1913, the company was taken over by his sons Hans and Fritz Frutiger, and in 1954, Max Frutiger joined the management. In 2001, cousins Luc and Thomas Frutiger became part of the management team, representing the fourth generation of family leadership.

In 1925, Frutiger acquired AG Balmholz and its stone quarry in Thun. This marked the first of many acquisitions throughout the 20th century. These include Balzan + Immer in 1987, Moll SA in 2000, Diamantbohr in 2004, Wenk AG in 2007, Greuter AG and Ernibohrtech AG in 2009, E-term AG in 2010, Rene May SA in 2011, Belloni SA in 2017, and since 2025, Frutiger has been in the process of acquiring Lehmann Holzwerk AG.

Notable projects range from local infrastructure, such as the Hotel Moy in Oberhofen (1906) and the Nuclear Power Plant in Thun (1961), to nationwide projects like the Dreirosen Bridge in Basel (2003). Frutiger has also undertaken international projects, for example the Pointe Noire Silo in Congo (1976).

At the beginning of 2008, Frutiger AG took over the business activities and 180 employees of the Marazzi construction company from Losinger Construction AG, a subdivision of Marazzi Holding, which Losinger took over in the summer of 2006. With the takeover of Kwartex Holding in October 2008, retroactive to January 2008, the Frutiger Group expanded its activities to include concrete cutting and separation, demolition and deep drilling in southern Germany and Alsace. In 2018, the Frutiger Group comprised 2,869 employees in 24 companies, 600 of whom worked at the parent company in Thun.

== Frutiger Today ==
Frutiger's current areas of expertise encompass:

- Construction: Building construction, road construction, civil engineering, building protection, underground construction, special civil engineering, floor coverings, flat roofs, formwork and supports, steel and metal construction, timber construction, conversion, and renovation.
- Technology: Electrical installations, laboratory technology, repair workshops, and environmental technology.
- Logistics: Cranes, mobile cranes and lifting platforms, transport, construction and equipment storage, containers, and modular construction, as well as general and total contracting.
- Real Estate: Real estate development, real estate services, and business development.

Frutiger's board of directors is led by Thomas and Luc Frutiger as co-chairmen. Other members include Katharina Lehmann and Martin Wipfli, joined by Werner Karlen in 2022, and Bruno Cathomen and Phylliss Scholl in 2025.

Thomas Frutiger serves on the board of Entwicklung Schweiz, an association focused on spatial planning, land policies, and construction-oriented urban development. Wipfli and Scholl are members of the The Liberals (Switzerland); Wipfli is also a partner at Baryon AG, a tax preparation service, and has served as Mayor of Feusisberg from 2013. Scholl is the Chairwoman of Unique, Mayor of Kilchberg, a board member of Repower, and part of Lazzarini AG. Karlen is a member of the Employers’ Organization in Basel, CEO of Sauter, and associated with Spaeter AG. Lehmann is a member of the St. Gallen-Appenzell Chamber of Commerce and CEO of Blumer Lehmann. Cathomen is involved with HSH Handling Systems AG, Elma Electronic, FIR Group AG, and EAO.

In 2025, Frutiger entered into an ARGE partnership with Losinger Marazzi as contractors for sites 2.3 and 2.4 of the Volta Nord project in Basel, a predominantly residential mixed-use development. The client is SBB, which owns the entire Site 2.
