= S90 (TILO) =

Railway line in Switzerland

Overview
- First service: 5 April 2021
- Current operator(s): Treni Regionali Ticino Lombardia

Route
- Termini: Giubiasco; Mendrisio
- Stops: 10
- Distance travelled: 44.7 kilometres (27.8 mi)
- Average journey time: 27 minutes (Giubiasco–Lugano); 49 minutes (Giubiasco–Mendrisio)
- Service frequency: 30 minutes (Giubiasco–Lugano); 60 minutes (Giubiasco–Mendrisio)
- Line(s) used: Gotthard line

Technical
- Rolling stock: RABe 523 / RABe 524

The S90 is a railway service that runs every half-hour between Giubiasco and Lugano in the Swiss canton of Ticino. Every other train is extended from Lugano to Mendrisio. The S90 uses the traditional Gotthard line, making local stops bypassed by the Ceneri Base Tunnel. Treni Regionali Ticino Lombardia (TILO), a joint venture of Swiss Federal Railways and Trenord, operates the service.

== Operations ==
The S90 runs half-hourly between Giubiasco and Lugano and hourly between Lugano and Mendrisio, using the traditional Gotthard line. All other scheduled passenger services use the Ceneri Base Tunnel between Giubiasco and Lugano. South of Lugano, the S90 supplements the RE80 and S10 / S50.

== History ==
The S90 was introduced on 5 April 2021, when the completion of the Ceneri Base Tunnel permitted a major reorganization of regional railway services in Ticino. The S90 replaced the S10 and S50 between Giubiasco and Lugano, as both services were re-routed through the tunnel, saving 12 minutes.
