= Bilfinger =

German construction and engineering company

Bilfinger SE
- Type: Societas Europaea
- Traded as: FWB: GBF; MDAX
- ISIN: DE0005909006
- Industry: Engineering and Services
- Predecessor: Julius Berger Tiefbau
- Founded: 1880
- Founder: Paul Bilfinger
- Headquarters: Mannheim, Germany
- Key people: Eckhard Cordes (Chairman of the supervisory board); Thomas Schulz (CEO)
- Revenue: ▲€3,737.4 million (2021)
- Operating income: ▲€121.2 million (2021)
- Net income: ▲€123.4 million (2021)
- Number of employees: 29,756 (2021)
- Website: www.bilfinger.com

Bilfinger SE (previously named Bilfinger Berger AG) is a German multinational company specialized in civil and industrial construction, engineering and services based in Mannheim, Germany.

== History ==
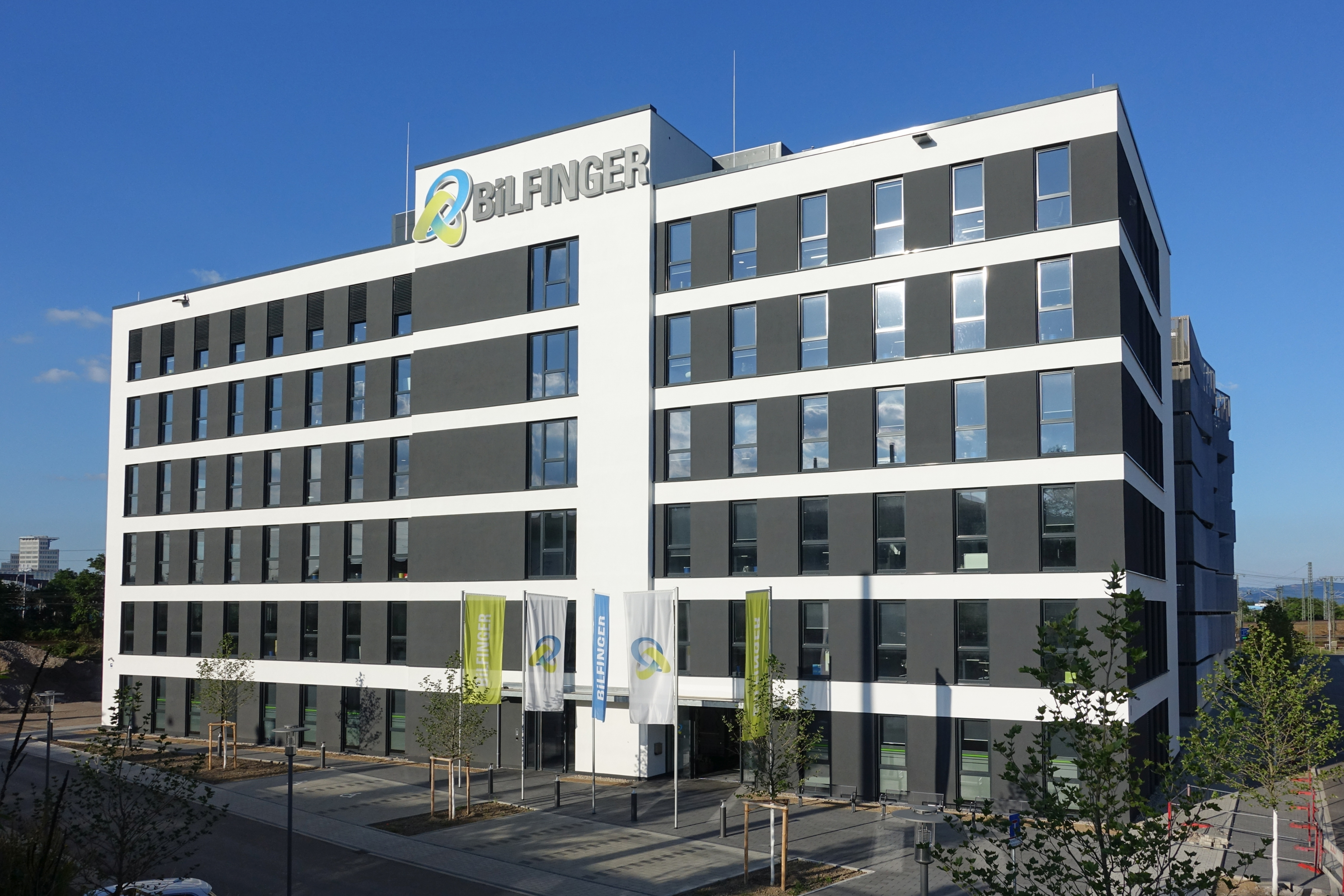
Head office in Mannheim

Bilfinger dates back to 1880 when August Bernatz founded Bernatz Ingenieurwissenschaft as an engineering business: it became known, from 1886 as Bernatz & Grün and, from 1892, as Grün & Bilfinger when Paul Bilfinger replaced Bernatz as partner.

During the Second World War, Grün & Bilfinger employed Jewish slave laborers from the Kovno Ghetto in occupied Lithuania where it was known for its brutal harassment of the Jewish slaves.

In 1970, Grün & Bilfinger acquired a majority stake in Julius Berger-Bauboag AG, itself a merger of two companies, Julius Berger Tiefbau AG and Berlinische Boden-Gesellschaft AG, both founded in 1890. The combined business, fully integrated in 1975, finally took the name Bilfinger & Berger Bauaktiengesellschaft. In 1994 the acquisition of Razel Company took place.

In 2001 the business changed its name to Bilfinger Berger AG.

In 2005, Bilfinger bought all shares of Babcock Borsig Service Group from Deutsche Beteiligungs AG.

In 2008 the company sold Razel to group Fayat for 137 million euro.

In October 2009 the company acquired directly MCE Beteiligungsverwaltungs GmbH itself, a business based in Linz focused on the design, construction and maintenance of facilities in the process industry and the energy sector.

In June 2010, a prospectus was issued with the aim of listing Bilfinger Berger Australia on the Australian Securities Exchange via an initial public offering. In July 2010 the listing was abandoned with a trade sale to Lendlease agreed in December 2010.

In 2010, services contributed to 80% of the company's total output volume of €8,123 million and EBIT for the services division amounted to €297 million. In November 2011, Bilfinger acquired 98 percent of shares in Neo Structo Construction Private Ltd., located in Surat, India, for a purchase price of €47 million. In 2010 Bilfinger became a Societas Europaea (SE).

In December 2014 Bilfinger signed a deal to sell the construction division to Switzerland's Implenia AG. It had once been Germany's second largest builder.

In June 2016 Bilfinger announced the sale of the facilities management and real estate business to Swedish financial investor EQT.

In February 2018 the company announced that it would seek damages from the former directors of the company after alleged breaches in compliance and a series of acquisitions that failed to create shareholder value. After securing shareholder consent in June 2020, Bilfinger reached a settlement with the former Executive Board members. The settlement with a total volume of €18.2 million ends the assertion of claims of for damages by Bilfinger.

== Operations ==
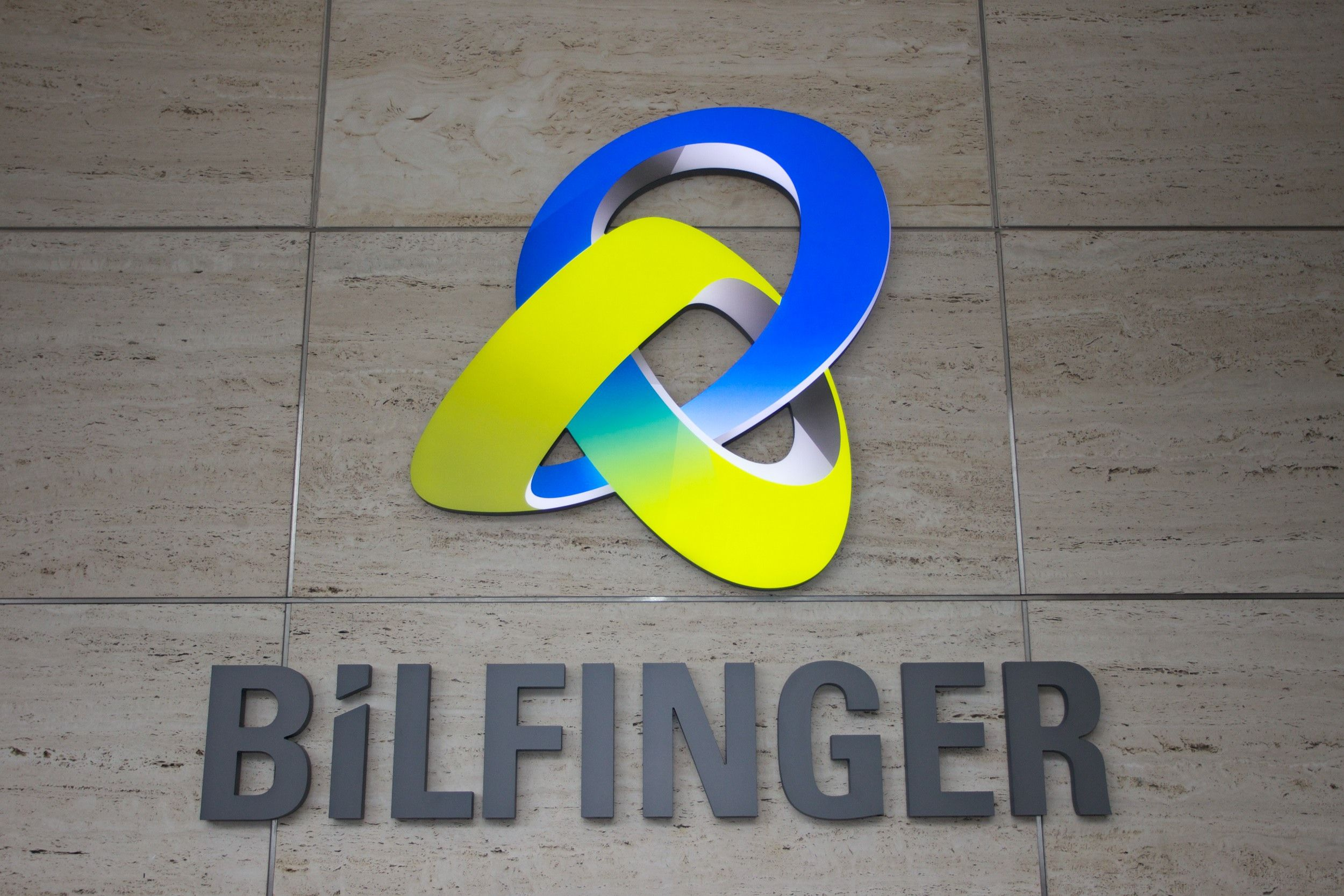
Bilfinger Logo at the entrance of Head Office (2012)

Bilfinger SE is a Deutsche Börse SDAX index traded, leading international industrial services provider. The portfolio covers the entire value chain from consulting, engineering, manufacturing, assembly, maintenance, plant expansion as well as turnarounds and also includes environmental technologies and digital applications.
Bilfinger, as a result of numerous acquisitions and disposals, is no longer a traditional construction company but instead a provider of services for industrial plants, power plants and real estate. In financial year 2019, revenues came from industrial and engineering services in the Chemical & Petrochemical (30%), Energy & Utilities (15%), Oil & Gas (30%), Pharma & Biopharma (10%), Metallurgy (5%) and Cement/Other (10%) industries.

== Ownership ==
The ownership of the business as at 31 December 2019 was as follows:

| Percentage | Investor |
|---|---|
| 74.3% | Institutional Investors |
| 16.9% | Undisclosed |
| 8.9% | Treasury Shares |
| 26.8% | Cevian Capital |
| 14.4 % | Institutional Investors Germany |
| 10.9% | Institutional Investors UK |
| 9.4 % | Institutional Investors USA |
| 4.7 % | Institutional Investors Switzerland |
| 3.9 % | Institutional Investors Scandinavia |
| 2.6% | Institutional Investors Spain |
| 1.2% | Institutional Investors France |
| 2.3% | Other Institutional Investors |

== Major projects ==
Major projects have included:

- Ludendorff Bridge at Remagen completed in 1919
- Busch Memorial Stadium completed in 1966
- Munich Olympic Stadium completed in 1972
- Dresdner Bank Tower completed in 1978,
- Oymapinar Dam in Turkey completed in 1984
- Bang Na Expressway completed in 2000
- Blue Line in Bangkok completed in 2004,
- Centennial Bridge over the Panama Canal completed in 2004,
- Svinesund Bridge between Sweden and Norway completed in 2005
- expansion of the Gloucestershire Royal Hospital completed in 2005,
- northern section of the Nuremberg–Munich high-speed railway completed in 2006
- Golden Ears Bridge near Vancouver in Canada completed in 2009,
- foundations for the London Array completed in 2009
- Niederfinow Boat Lift in Germany completed in 2014
- restoration and conversion of Sonnenstein Castle in Pirna for the Administration Offices in Sächsische Schweiz-Osterzgebirge in Germany completed in 2012
- Block 9 of the Power station of Mannheim in Germany completed in 2013
- Edinburgh Trams line in Scotland completed in 2014
- North-South line of Cologne Stadtbahn in Germany completed in 2015
- Sedrun section of Gotthard Base Tunnel in Switzerland (along with Frutiger AG, Implenia and Impresa Pizzarotti as part of the Transco consortium) completed in 2016
- Düsseldorf Stadtbahn from Düsseldorf-Bilk station to Düsseldorf Wehrhahn station completed in 2016

== Controversies ==
In March 2009, a building collapsed in Cologne due to the nearby construction site for the Cologne Stadtbahn Nord-Süd-Stadtbahn (in German). The collapse is suspected to be caused by the construction works, and to several irregularities. In June 2020, Bilfinger reached an out-of-court agreement that settles all civil claims arising from the collapse of the city’s municipal archive building.

Several other construction projects are suspected to have been conducted with irregularities: the Düsseldorf Stadtbahn Wehrhahn-Linie (in German), the Nuremberg–Munich high-speed railway and the Bundesautobahn 1.

In November 2018, Bilfinger was sued by Christopher Steele, who alleged that the company owed €150,000 for an investigation into Bilfinger's activities in Nigeria and Sakhalin.

== See also ==
- Babcock Borsig Service
