= Ceneri Base Tunnel =

Railway tunnel through the Swiss Alps

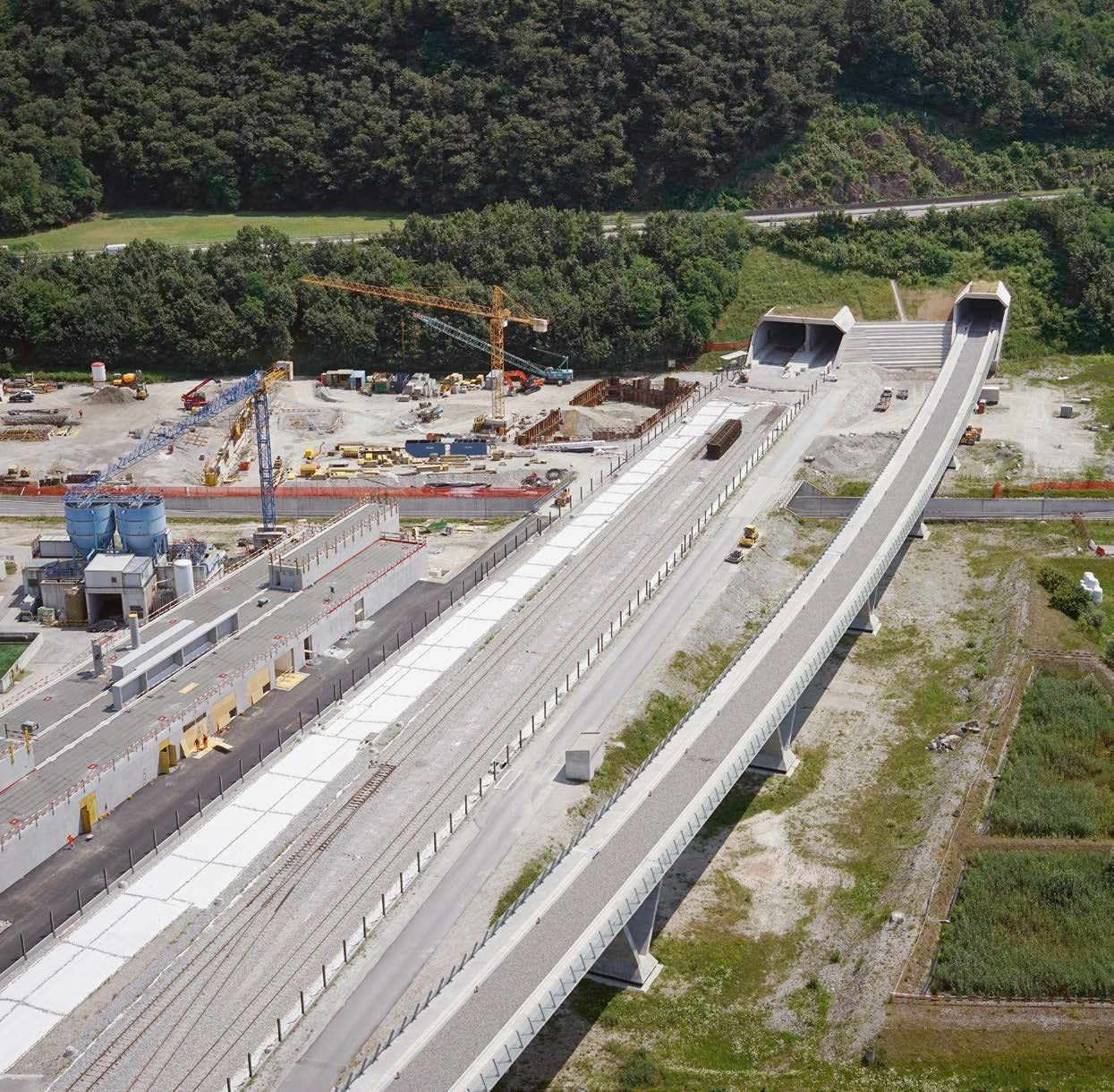
- North portal in 2018

Overview
- Line: Gotthard Line
- Location: Ticino, Switzerland
- Coordinates: 46°07′09″N 8°59′27″E
- Status: Operational
- System: Swiss Federal Railways (SBB CFF FFS)
- Crosses: Monte Ceneri
- Start: Camorino in the Magadino Flat near Bellinzona, canton of Ticino
- End: Vezia near Lugano, canton of Ticino

Operation
- Opened: 4 September 2020
- Owner: SBB Infrastructure
- Operator: SBB CFF FFS
- Traffic: Railway
- Character: Passenger and freight

Technical
- Length: 15.4 km (9.6 mi)
- No. of tracks: 2 single-track tubes
- Track gauge: 1,435 mm (4 ft 8 1/2 in) (standard gauge)
- Electrified: 15 kV 16.7 Hz
- Operating speed: Passenger (service): 200 km/h (125 mph); Passenger (if delayed): 230 km/h (143 mph); Maximum (technical): 250 km/h (155 mph); Freight (minimum): 100 km/h (62 mph)

Route map
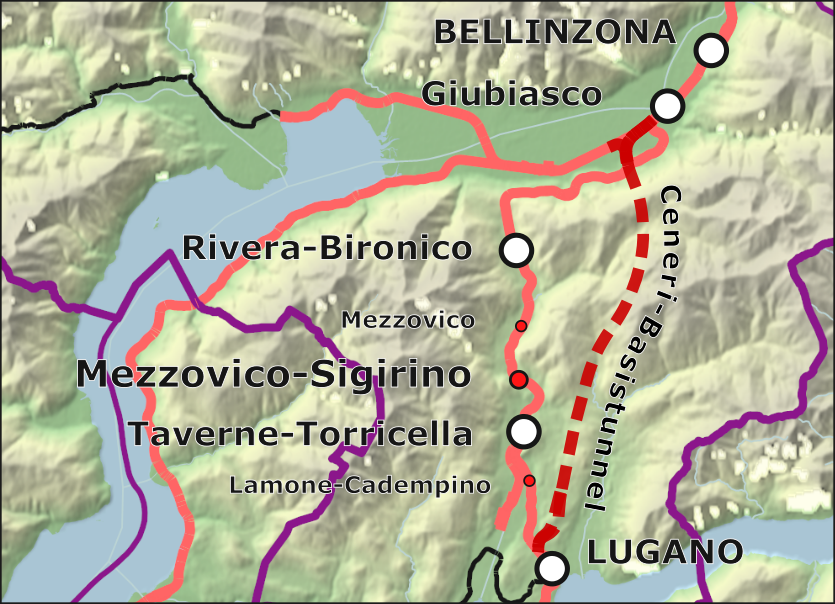

The Ceneri Base Tunnel (CBT; Italian: Galleria di base del Monte Ceneri) is a Swiss railway base tunnel in the canton of Ticino. It passes under Monte Ceneri between Camorino in the Magadino Flat and Vezia near Lugano; it bypasses the former high-altitude rail route through the Monte Ceneri Tunnel. It is composed of two single-track tunnels, each 15.4 km (9.6 mi) long. It is part of the New Railway Link through the Alps (NRLA) project for faster north-south rail links across the Swiss Alps.

An exploration tunnel near Sigirino was excavated between 1999 and 2003 to gain geological data on the rock formations at the Ceneri Base Tunnel's level. Based on those data, it was decided to excavate most of the tunnel with traditional blasting methods and only drill a small part using a faster tunnel boring machine (TBM). Both the CBT and Gotthard Base Tunnels were built under contract from the Swiss Federal Government by Alptransit Gotthard AG. Construction of the two single-track bores started during March 2006. The official start of the CBT's construction phase was celebrated on 2 June 2006 with the laying of a foundation stone. The final breakthroughs took place on 21 January 2016 (west tube) and 26 January 2016 (east tube). Rail service started on 4 September 2020 and was operationalised for freight in December 2020.

On opening, the Ceneri Base Tunnel has become an important southern feeder for the Gotthard Base Tunnel as the existing, proportionally steep and curvy track over Monte Ceneri is not suitable for high speeds or heavy freight trains. Another feeder is the Luino link along Lake Maggiore which is about to be upgraded by Italy in prospect of the opening of the Gotthard Base Tunnel. Both links meet in the Magadino Flat in the future Camorino Node (Italian: Nodo di Camorino). The CBT will ease local train traffic, mainly between the two major cities Locarno and Lugano but also between Bellinzona and Lugano. Travel time on the TILO, an S-Bahn, from Locarno to Lugano dropped from 50 to 22 minutes.

== History ==
=== Background ===
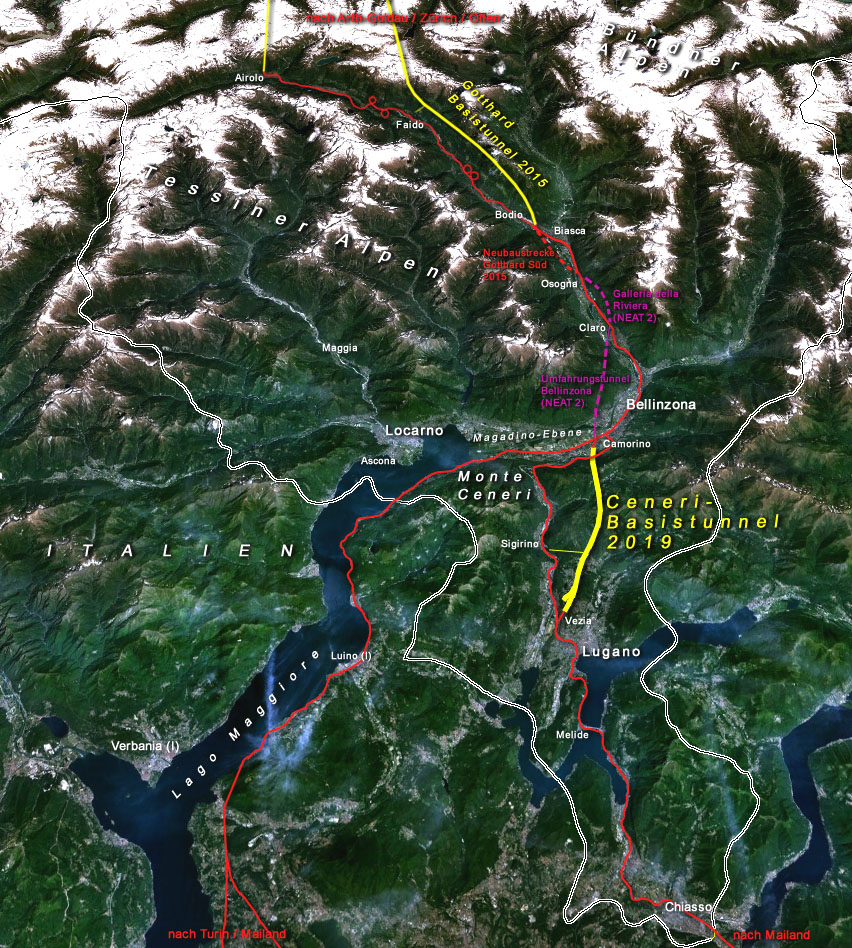
Gotthard and Ceneri Base Tunnel. The route through Luino follows the lake shores.

The Ceneri Base Tunnel is the lowest of the routes through the Ceneri axis and connects Camorino in the Magadino Flat to Vezia near Lugano. It allows traffic to bypass the conventional high-level railway running through the historic Monte Ceneri Tunnel. It forms only one element of a wider effort, commonly referred to as the New Rail Link through the Alps (NRLA) programme, which is being developed by AlpTransit Gotthard AG (ATG), a wholly owned subsidiary of the Swiss Federal Railways (SBB). When it became operational in December 2020, the Ceneri Base Tunnel began working together with the longer Gotthard Base Tunnel to significantly shorten the journey times between the Northern Swiss city of Zürich and the Northern Italian city of Milan by providing a flatter route for freight and passenger trains than previous conventional lines.

The Ceneri Base Tunnel carries a pair of parallel bores, each containing a single-track, set 40 metres (130 ft) apart from one another and connected by cross passages at evenly spaced intervals of 325 metres (1,066 ft). Stretching between the towns of Camorino and Vezia, it possesses a total length of 39.78 kilometres (24.72 mi); the eastern bore has a length of 15.45 kilometres (9.60 mi) and the west bore is 15.28 kilometres (9.49 mi) long. An operations center controlling ventilation and logistical activities has been constructed at Sigirino. Operationally, the Ceneri Base Tunnel was anticipated to be used by in excess of 300 trains each day travelling in both directions. It has been furnished with ETCS Level 2 signalling, allowing for trains to traverse it at speeds of up to 250 kilometres per hour (160 mph). Although the technical maximum speed is 250 km/h (160 mph) through the Ceneri tunnel, the maximal authorized speed has been reduced to 230 km/h (140 mph) for ecological and economical reasons, while the operating speed of passenger trains is restricted to 200 km/h (124 mph) in order to accommodate the freight traffic, with the possibility to accelerate up to 230 km/h in case of delay.

For handling emergency situations in the Ceneri Base Tunnel, the Swiss Federal Railways has acquired a fleet of dedicated rescue trains; these are equipped with specialised fire fighting equipment and other useful facilities, such as independent air supplies.

The Ceneri Base Tunnel was approved in July 2001 by the Swiss Federal Council, clearing the way for detailing planning activity to proceed. Further Parliamentary approval of the selected route for the tunnel was received in 2003, and the first funds towards construction were released during 2005. During April 2007, AlpTransit Gotthard AG awarded a Sfr85m ($91.52m) contract for the construction of the first underground element of the tunnel to Consorzio Monte Ceneri (CMC) JV, a consortium of CSC, Lugano, Frutiger, Thun, Rothpletz, Lienhard & Cie, and Aarau. During June 2009, the Board of Directors of AlpTransit Gotthard AG announced that it had awarded the principal contract for the tunnel's construction to the Consorzio Condotte Cossi consortium. At the time, the tunnel was expected to be operational by December 2020. This contract was valued at Sfr987 million ($1.6 billion). The estimated total cost for the Ceneri Base Tunnel is Sfr2.4 billion ($2.58 billion).

=== Construction ===
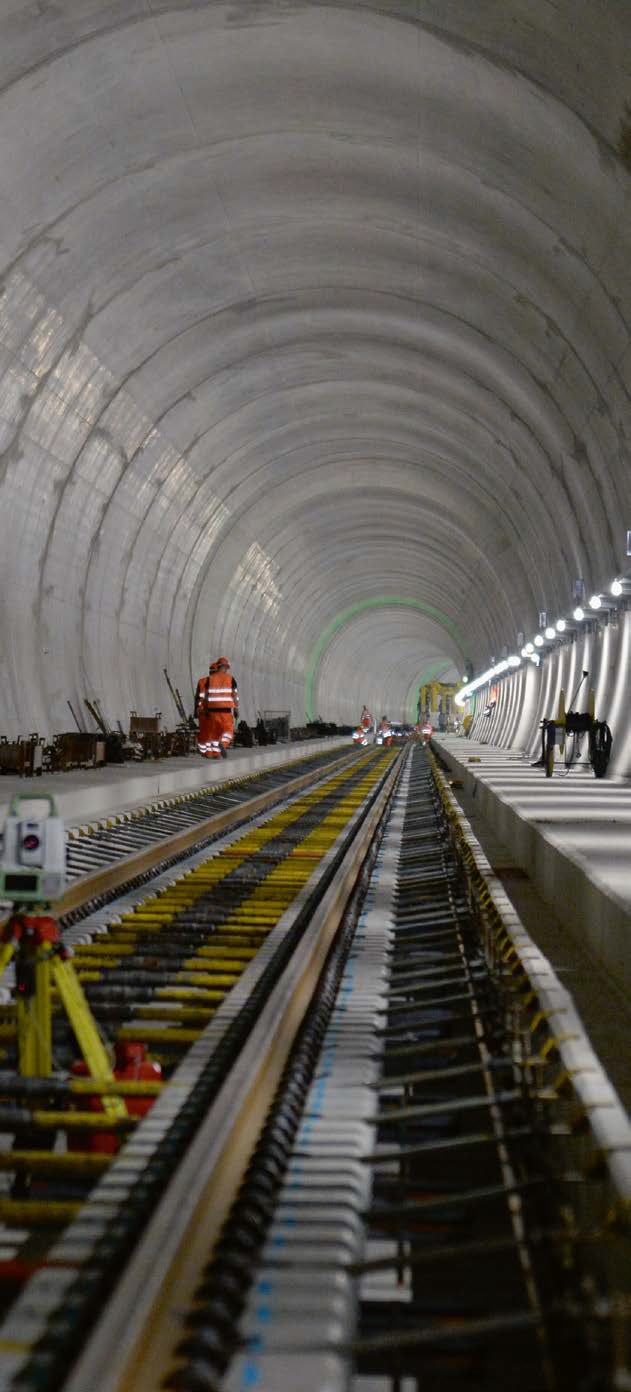
Final works in the west tube.

During June 2006, construction work on the tunnel officially commenced. In November 2008, the excavation of a 2.4-kilometre-long (1.5 mi) adit tunnel was completed, involving the excavation of 160,000 cubic metres (5.7 million cubic feet) of hard rock. A tunnel boring machine (TBM), provided by Robbins Company and equipped with 483-millimetre (19.0 in) cutters, was used to bore the adit tunnel over the course of ten months during which it advanced at a rate of 18.5 metres (61 ft) per day. During the spring of 2010, work commenced upon the boring of the Ceneri Base Tunnel itself. During March 2010, it was announced that blasting had begun on the main drives of the twin-bores. By the end of the year, the rate of tunneling had reportedly attained its full speed. A combination of conventional drilling and blasting techniques were used to bore approximately 37.49 kilometres (23.30 mi) of the tunnel (including the two main tubes and access tunnels), while the remainder was bored using a TBM.

Breakthrough in the west tube between Sigirino and Vezia occurred on 17 March 2015. Breakthrough in the east tube between Sigirino and Vezia occurred on 30 March 2015. On 21 January 2016, breakthrough was achieved in the west bore between Sigirino and Vigana, while the breakthrough in the east bore between Sigirino and Vigana occurred on 26 January 2016. That same day, it was announced that the excavation process had been completed, and the installation of railway infrastructure was the next major stage of the work. During February 2017, the final concrete block was placed in a ceremony marking the tunnel becoming structurally complete.

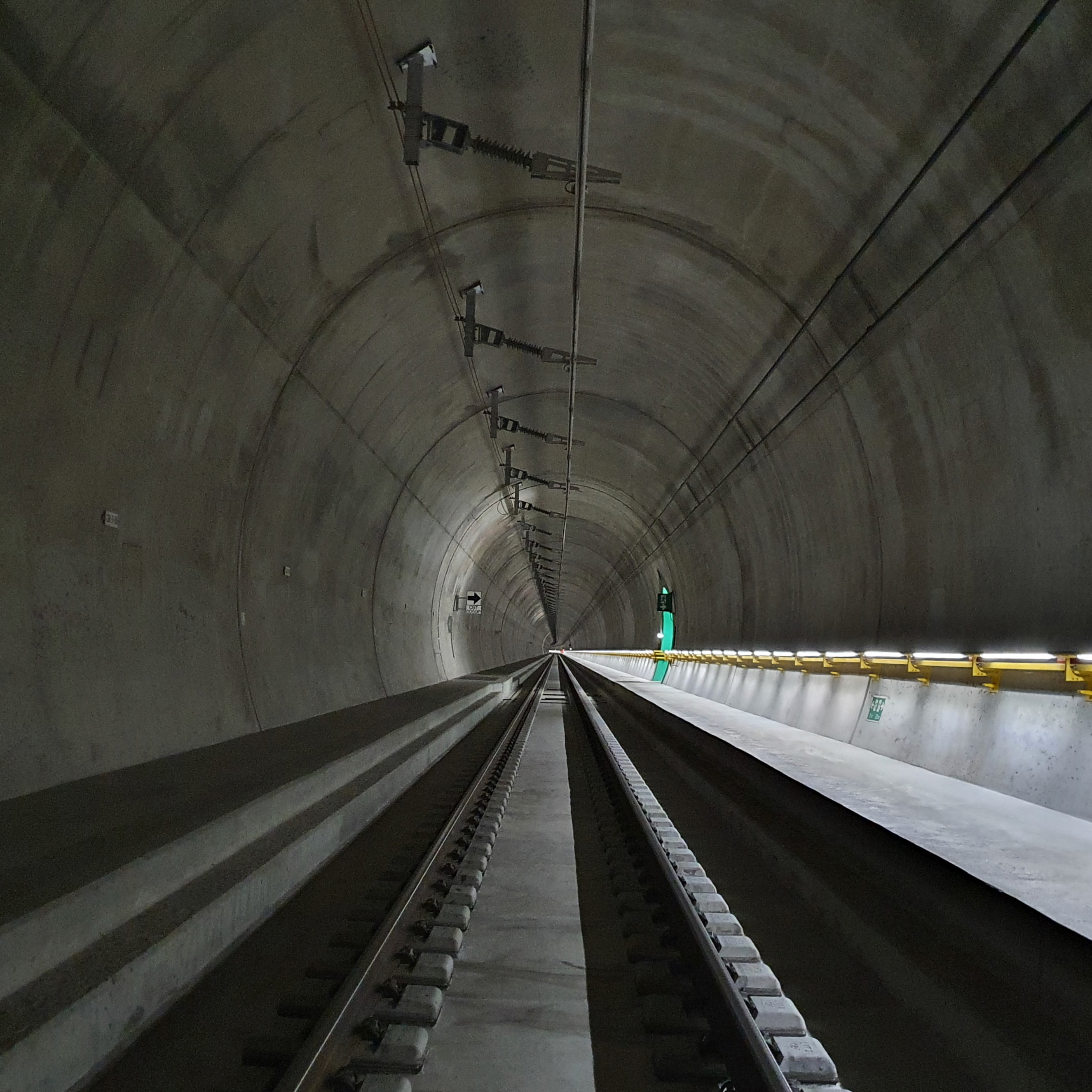
Interior of the tunnel after construction had finished

During August 2013, the Mons Ceneris Consortium, headed by Mancini & Marti, was awarded a Sfr96 million ($103.36 million) contract to provide railway track and logistics for the tunnel. That same month, the Cablex-led CPC Consortium won a Sfr129 million ($138.89 million) contract to provide railway systems and overall tunnel co-ordination services. The planning, supply, installation and commissioning of the tunnel control systems, which are to be controlled from a control centre at Pollegio, has been contracted to Tunnel Control Systems. The awarding of these contracts was not without controversy; a pair of appeals were subsequently upheld by the Federal Supreme Court of Switzerland regarding the awarding process. At one point, it looked as if the completion of the Ceneri Base Tunnel may be delayed as a consequence of legal disputes. However, the dispute was settled during September 2014, which unblocked the awarding of contracts as well as allowing for work to proceed.

During 2017 the installation of the track, electrical supply cables, telecommunications and radio systems, automation systems, overhead lines, and various safety and control systems commenced. During August 2017, the first sections of ballastless track were laid in the northern end of the eastern bore. On 30 May 2018, the final railroad tie was laid, meaning that trains would be able to travel the entire length of the tunnel.

The tunnel was officially opened on 4 September 2020. Final testing concluded with a rescue test in October 2020, and routine operations began in December 2020. The construction has cost CHF 2.5bn.

Construction monthly progress
Year	Month	Total excavated		
Year	Month	km	mi	% (Note: percentage of 39.780 km (24.718 mi))
2010	1 January	7.600	4.72	18.9
2010	1 February	7.637	4.75	19.0
2010	1 March	7.673	4.77	19.1
2010	1 April	7.731	4.80	19.4
2010	1 May	7.880	4.90	19.8
2010	1 June	8.101	5.03	20.4
2010	1 July	8.344	5.18	21.0
2010	1 August	8.816	5.48	22.2
2010	1 September	9.102	5.66	22.9
2010	1 October	9.466	5.88	23.8
2010	1 November	9.962	6.19	25.0
2010	1 December	10.460	6.50	26.3
2011	1 January	10.820	6.72	27.2
2011	1 February	11.360	7.06	28.6
2011	1 March	11.890	7.39	29.9
2011	1 April	12.345	7.67	31.0
2011	1 May	12.660	7.87	31.8
2011	1 June	13.140	8.16	33.0
2011	1 July	13.580	8.44	34.2
2011	1 August	13.960	8.67	35.1
2011	1 September	14.240	8.85	35.8
2011	1 October	14.780	9.18	37.2
2011	1 November	15.550	9.66	39.1
2011	1 December	16.270	10.11	40.9
2012	1 January	16.800	10.44	42.4
2012	1 February	17.390	10.81	43.7
2012	1 March	17.900	11.12	45.2
2012	1 April	18.600	11.56	46.9
2012	1 May	19.200	11.93	48.3
2012	1 June	20.000	12.43	50.3
2012	1 July	20.600	12.80	51.8
2012	1 August	21.100	13.11	53.1
2012	1 September	21.300	13.24	53.7
2012	1 October	21.800	13.55	54.8
2012	1 November	22.300	13.86	56.0
2012	1 December	22.800	14.17	57.3
2013	1 January	23.000	14.29	57.9
2013	1 February	23.500	14.60	59.0
2013	1 March	24.000	14.91	60.5
2013	1 April	24.600	15.29	61.8
2013	1 May	25.160	15.63	63.2
2013	1 June	25.670	15.95	64.5
2013	1 July	26.120	16.23	65.6
2013	1 August	26.400	16.40	66.5
2013	1 September	26.800	16.65	67.4
2013	1 October	27.300	16.96	68.6
2013	1 November	27.850	17.31	70.0
2013	1 December	28.500	17.71	71.7
2014	1 January	28.500	17.71	71.7
2014	1 February	29.400	18.27	73.9
2014	1 March	29.700	18.45	74.8
2014	1 April	30.230	18.78	76.0
2014	1 May	30.620	19.03	76.9
2014	1 June	31.280	19.44	78.6
2014	1 July	31.930	19.84	80.2
2014	1 August	32.590	20.25	81.9
2014	1 September	32.830	20.40	82.5
2014	1 October	33.490	20.81	84.1
2014	1 November	33.980	21.11	85.4
2014	1 December	34.400	21.38	86.4
2015	1 January	34.750	21.59	87.3
2015	1 February	35.350	21.97	88.8
2015	1 March	35.910	22.31	90.2
2015	1 April	36.330	22.57	91.3
2015	1 May	36.810	22.87	92.5
2015	1 June	37.350	23.21	93.8
2015	1 July	37.680	23.41	94.7
2015	1 August	38.090	23.67	95.7
2015	1 September	38.280	23.79	96.2
2015	1 October	38.660	24.02	97.2
2015	1 November	38.970	24.21	97.9
2015	1 December	39.430	24.50	99.1
2016	1 January	39.670	24.65	99.7
2016	1 February	39.780	24.72	100
Note:

The monthly progress update graphic was available online.

== See also ==
- NRLA
- Gotthard Base Tunnel
- Lötschberg Base Tunnel
- Zimmerberg Base Tunnel
