= Cappella-Agnuzzo railway station =

Railway station in Switzerland

Cappella-Agnuzzo
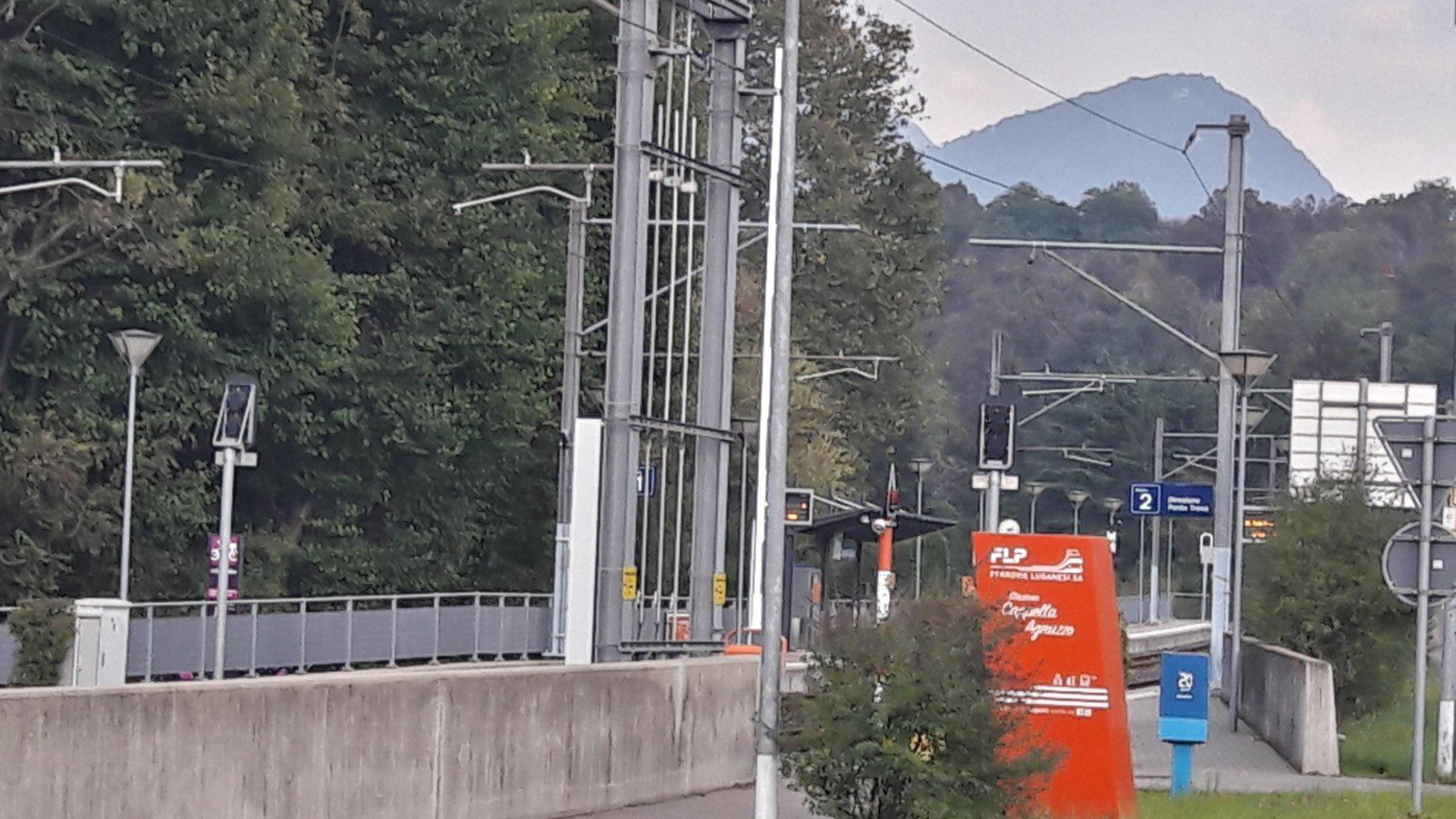
- The station in 2018

General information
- Location: Collina d'Oro; Switzerland
- Coordinates: 45°59′36″N 8°55′28″E
- Elevation: 341 m (1,119 ft)
- Owner: Ferrovie Luganesi
- Line: Lugano–Ponte Tresa line
- Distance: 2.6 km (1.6 mi) from Lugano FLP
- Platforms: 2
- Train operators: Ferrovie Luganesi

Services
Preceding station	Ferrovie Luganesi	Following station
Bioggio Molinazzo towards Ponte Tresa	S60	Sorengo Laghetto towards Lugano FLP
Location
- Location within Switzerland Location within Canton of Ticino

Cappella-Agnuzzo railway station is a railway station in the municipality of Collina d'Oro in the Swiss canton of Ticino. The station is on the metre gauge Lugano–Ponte Tresa railway (FLP), between Lugano and Ponte Tresa.

The station has a passing loop, with side platforms.

== Services ==
As of the December 2021 timetable change, the following services stop at Cappella-Agnuzzo:

- S60: service every fifteen minutes between Lugano FLP and Ponte Tresa on weekdays and half-hourly on weekends.
