= Magliaso Paese railway station =

Railway station in Switzerland

Magliaso Paese
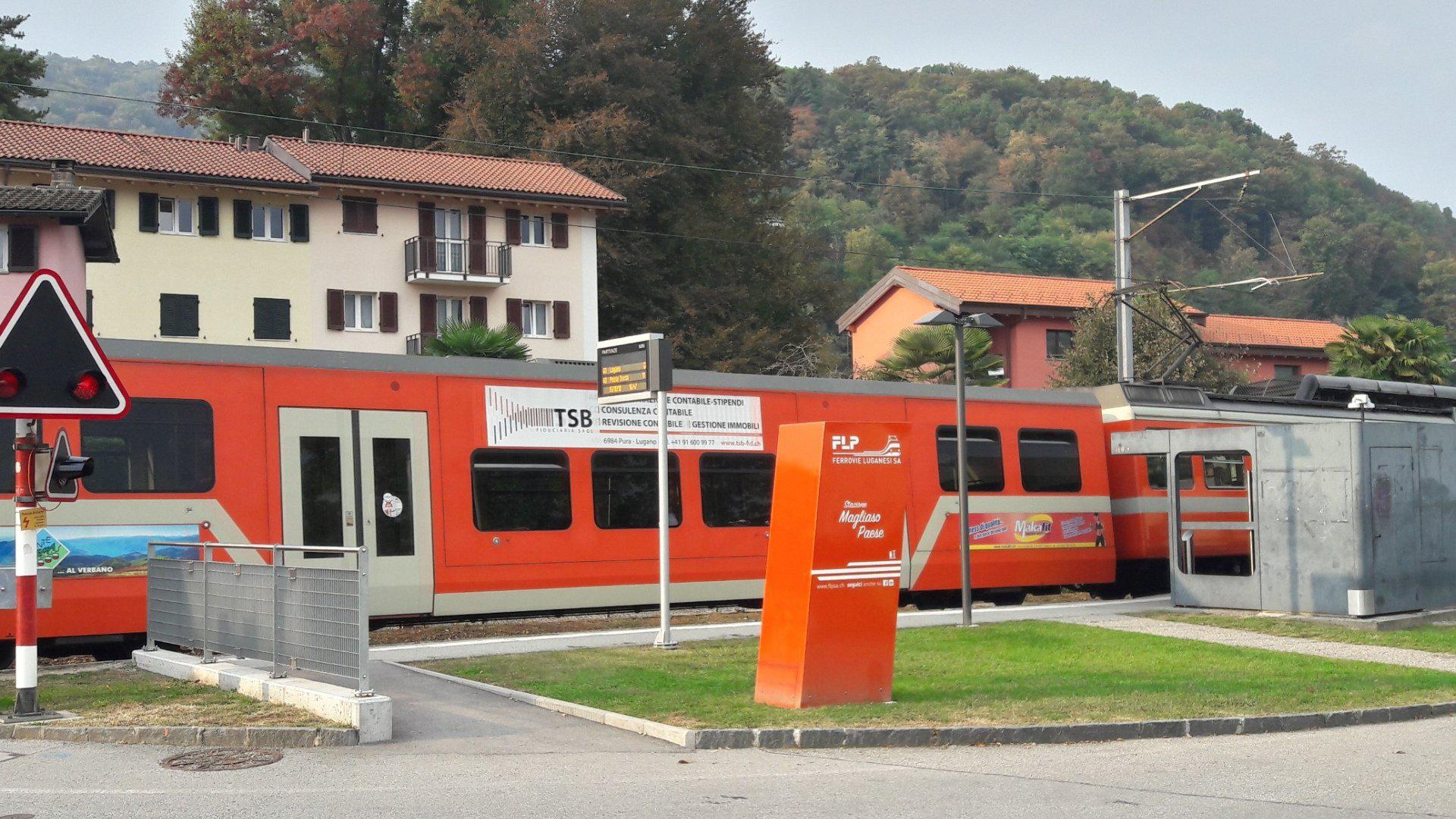
- A train at the station platform in 2018

General information
- Location: Magliaso; Switzerland
- Coordinates: 45°58′59″N 8°53′28″E
- Owner: Ferrovie Luganesi
- Line: Lugano–Ponte Tresa line
- Distance: 9.5 km (5.9 mi) from Lugano FLP
- Platforms: 1
- Train operators: Ferrovie Luganesi

Services
Preceding station	Ferrovie Luganesi	Following station
Magliaso towards Ponte Tresa	S60	Agno towards Lugano FLP
Location
- Location within Switzerland Location within Canton of Ticino

Magliaso Paese railway station is a railway station in the municipality of Magliaso in the Swiss canton of Ticino. The station is on the metre gauge Lugano–Ponte Tresa railway (FLP), between Lugano and Ponte Tresa.

The station has a single platform, which is used by trains operating in both directions.

== Services ==
As of the December 2021 timetable change, the following services stop at Magliaso Paese:

- S60: service every fifteen minutes between Lugano FLP and Ponte Tresa on weekdays and half-hourly on weekends.
