= Magliaso railway station =

Railway station in Magliaso, Ticino, Switzerland

Magliaso
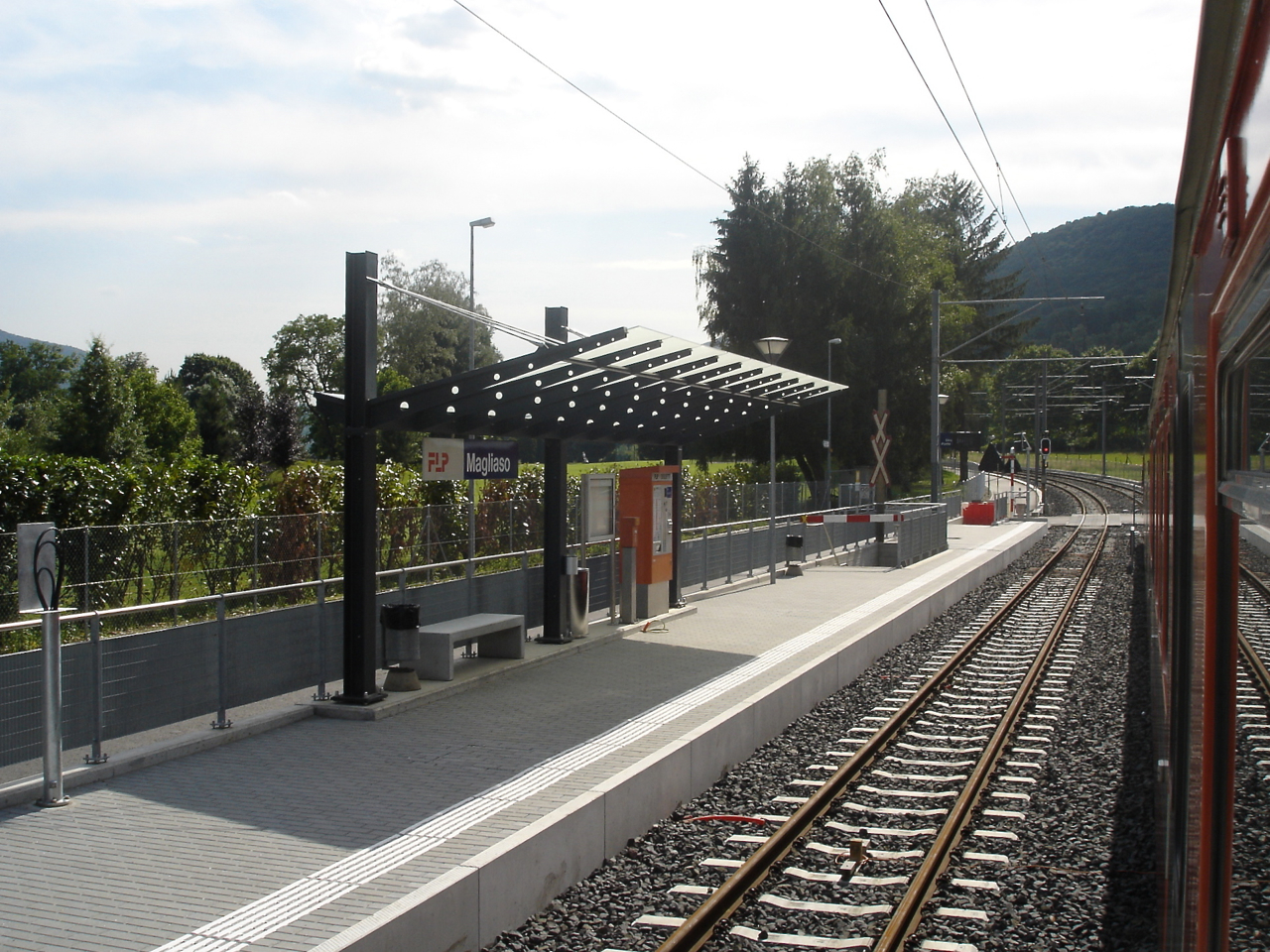
- The station platform in 2007

General information
- Location: Magliaso; Switzerland
- Coordinates: 45°58′54″N 8°53′03″E
- Elevation: 290 m (950 ft)
- Owner: Ferrovie Luganesi
- Line: Lugano–Ponte Tresa line
- Distance: 9.9 km (6.2 mi) from Lugano FLP
- Platforms: 2
- Train operators: Ferrovie Luganesi
- Connections: Autopostale bus services

Services
Preceding station	Ferrovie Luganesi	Following station
Caslano towards Ponte Tresa	S60	Magliaso Paese towards Lugano FLP
Location
- Location within Switzerland Location within Canton of Ticino

Magliaso railway station is a railway station in the municipality of Magliaso in the Swiss canton of Ticino. The station is on the metre gauge Lugano–Ponte Tresa railway (FLP), between Lugano and Ponte Tresa.

The station has a passing loop, with two side platforms. It was rebuilt in 1979, in collaboration with the PTT.

== Services ==
As of the December 2021 timetable change, the following services stop at Magliaso:

- S60: service every fifteen minutes between Lugano FLP and Ponte Tresa on weekdays and half-hourly on weekends.
