= Bioggio Molinazzo railway station =

Railway station in Switzerland

Bioggio Molinazzo
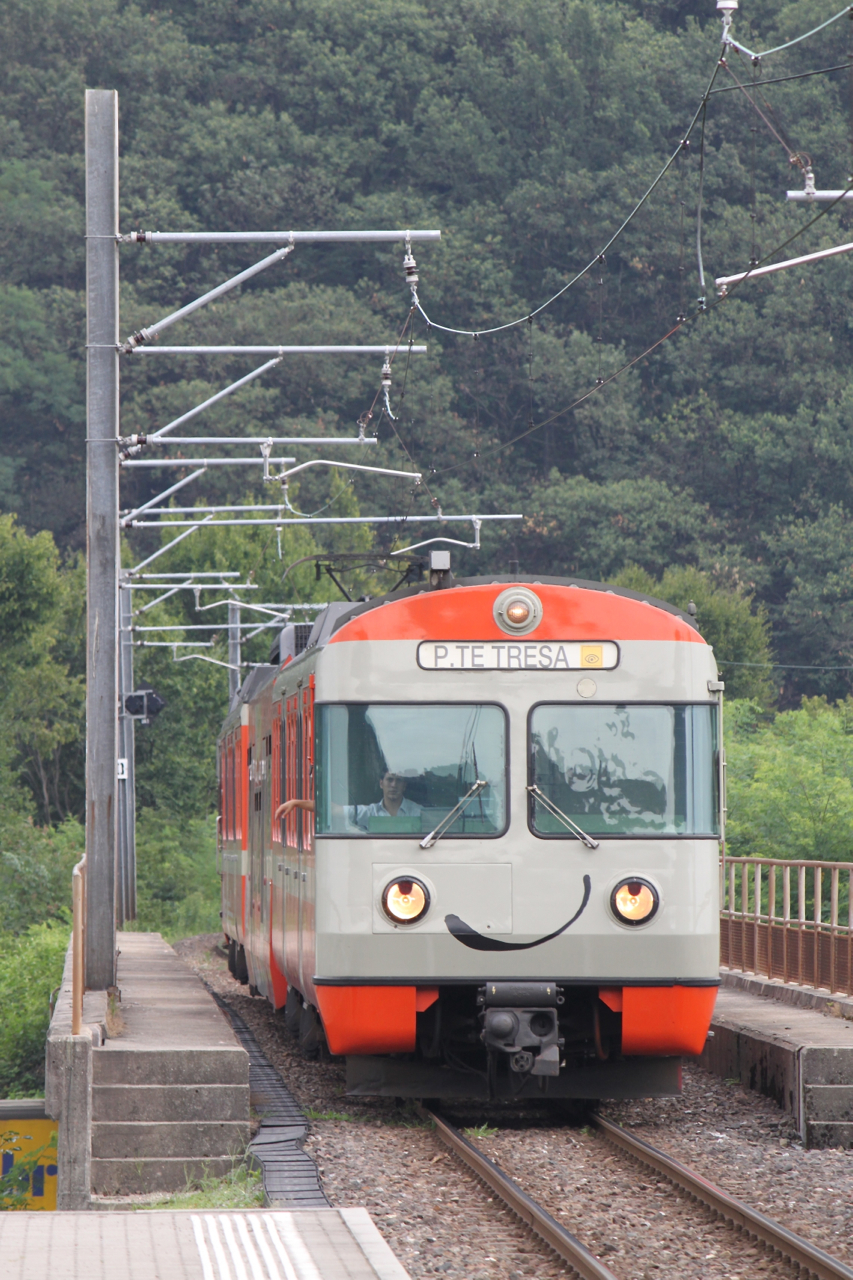

General information
- Location: Bioggio; Switzerland
- Coordinates: 46°00′45″N 8°54′50″E
- Owner: Ferrovie Luganesi
- Line: Lugano–Ponte Tresa line
- Distance: 5.4 km (3.4 mi) from Lugano FLP
- Platforms: 1
- Train operators: Ferrovie Luganesi

Services
Preceding station	Ferrovie Luganesi	Following station
Bioggio towards Ponte Tresa	S60	Cappella-Agnuzzo towards Lugano FLP
Location
- Location within Switzerland Location within Canton of Ticino

Bioggio Molinazzo railway station is a railway station in the municipality of Bioggio in the Swiss canton of Ticino. The station is on the metre gauge Lugano–Ponte Tresa railway (FLP), between Lugano and Ponte Tresa.

The station has a single platform, served by trains in both directions. There is also a siding, used by maintenance trains. The station was constructed and commissioned in 2001.

== Services ==
As of the December 2021 timetable change, the following services stop at Bioggio Molinazzo:

- S60: service every fifteen minutes between Lugano FLP and Ponte Tresa on weekdays and half-hourly on weekends.
