= Bioggio railway station =

Railway station in Switzerland

Bioggio
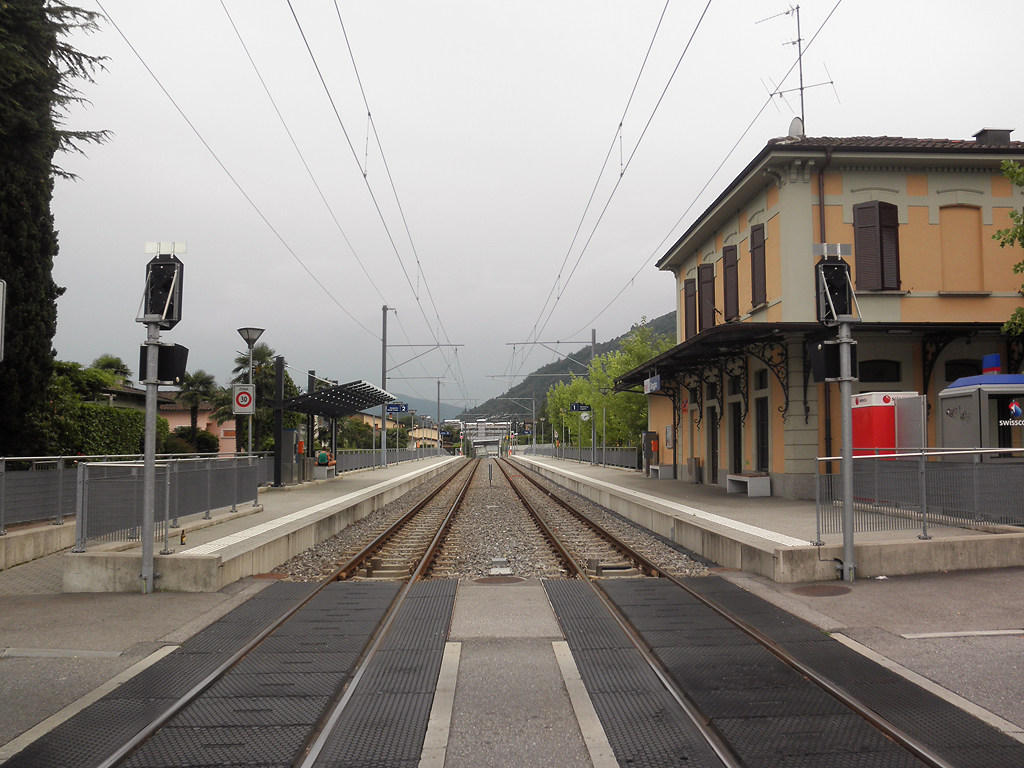
- The station in 2012

General information
- Location: Bioggio; Switzerland
- Coordinates: 46°00′44″N 8°54′32″E
- Elevation: 292 m (958 ft) AMSL
- Owner: Ferrovie Luganesi
- Line: Lugano–Ponte Tresa line
- Distance: 5.8 km (3.6 mi) from Lugano FLP
- Platforms: 2
- Train operators: Ferrovie Luganesi

Services
Preceding station	Ferrovie Luganesi	Following station
Serocca towards Ponte Tresa	S60	Bioggio Molinazzo towards Lugano FLP
Location
- Location within Switzerland Location within Canton of Ticino

Bioggio railway station is a railway station in the municipality of Bioggio in the Swiss canton of Ticino. The station is on the metre gauge Lugano–Ponte Tresa railway (FLP), between Lugano and Ponte Tresa.

The station is on a section of double track line, which stretches from just north of the station to Serocca station. It has two side platforms.

== Services ==
As of the December 2021 timetable change, the following services stop at Bioggio:

- S60: service every fifteen minutes between Lugano FLP and Ponte Tresa on weekdays and half-hourly on weekends.
