= Serocca railway station =

Railway station in Switzerland

Serocca
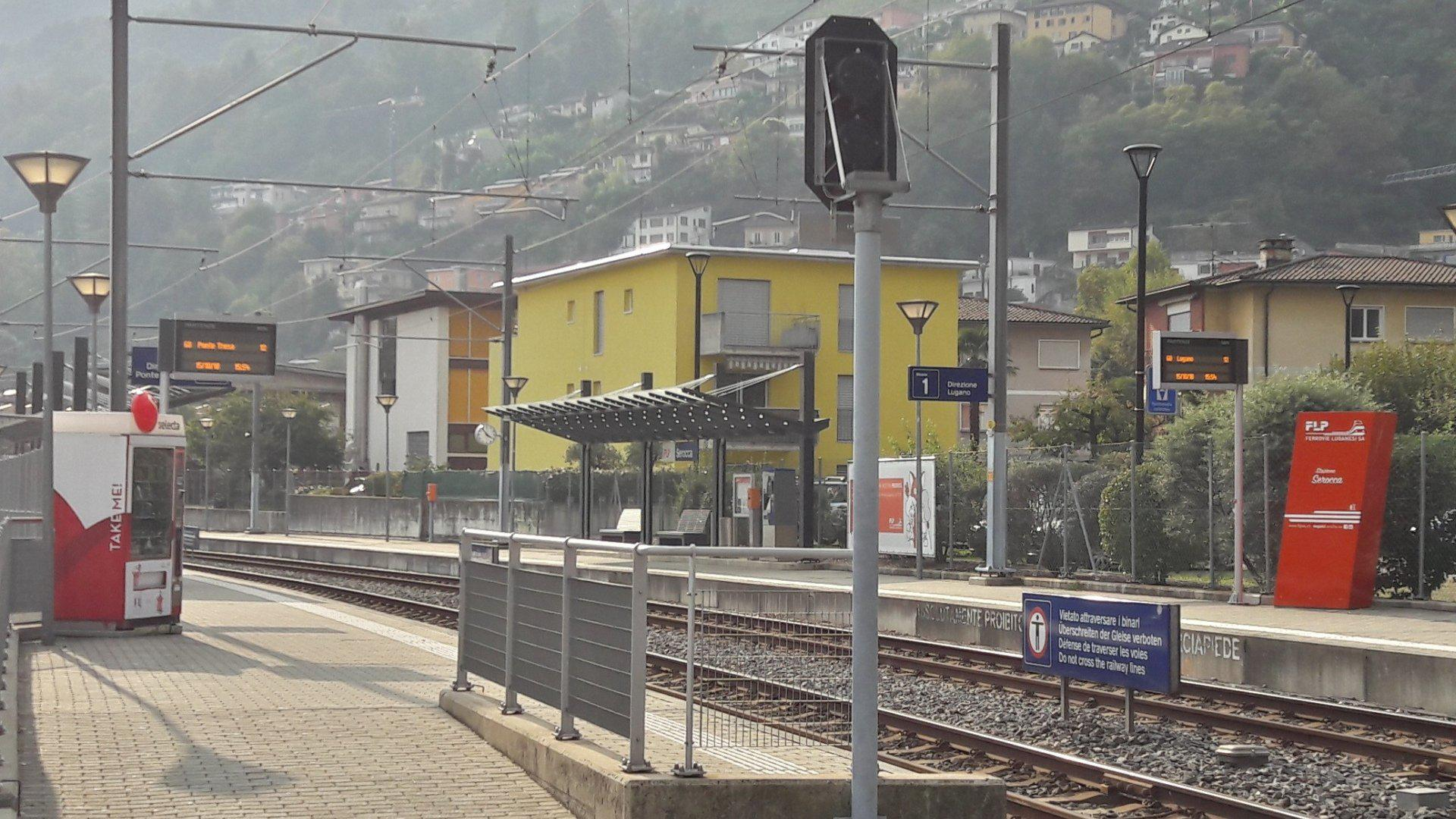
- The station in 2018

General information
- Location: Agno; Switzerland
- Coordinates: 46°00′31″N 8°54′16″E
- Owner: Ferrovie Luganesi
- Line: Lugano–Ponte Tresa line
- Distance: 6.6 km (4.1 mi) from Lugano FLP
- Platforms: 2
- Train operators: Ferrovie Luganesi

Services
Preceding station	Ferrovie Luganesi	Following station
Agno towards Ponte Tresa	S60	Bioggio towards Lugano FLP
Location
- Location within Switzerland Location within Canton of Ticino

Serocca railway station is a railway station in the municipality of Agno in the Swiss canton of Ticino. The station is on the metre gauge Lugano–Ponte Tresa railway (FLP), between Lugano and Ponte Tresa.

The station is on a section of double track line, which stretches from just south of the station to Bioggio station. It has two side platforms.

== Services ==
As of the December 2021 timetable change, the following services stop at Serocca:

- S60: service every fifteen minutes between Lugano FLP and Ponte Tresa on weekdays and half-hourly on weekends.
