= Sorengo Laghetto railway station =

Swiss railway station

Sorengo Laghetto
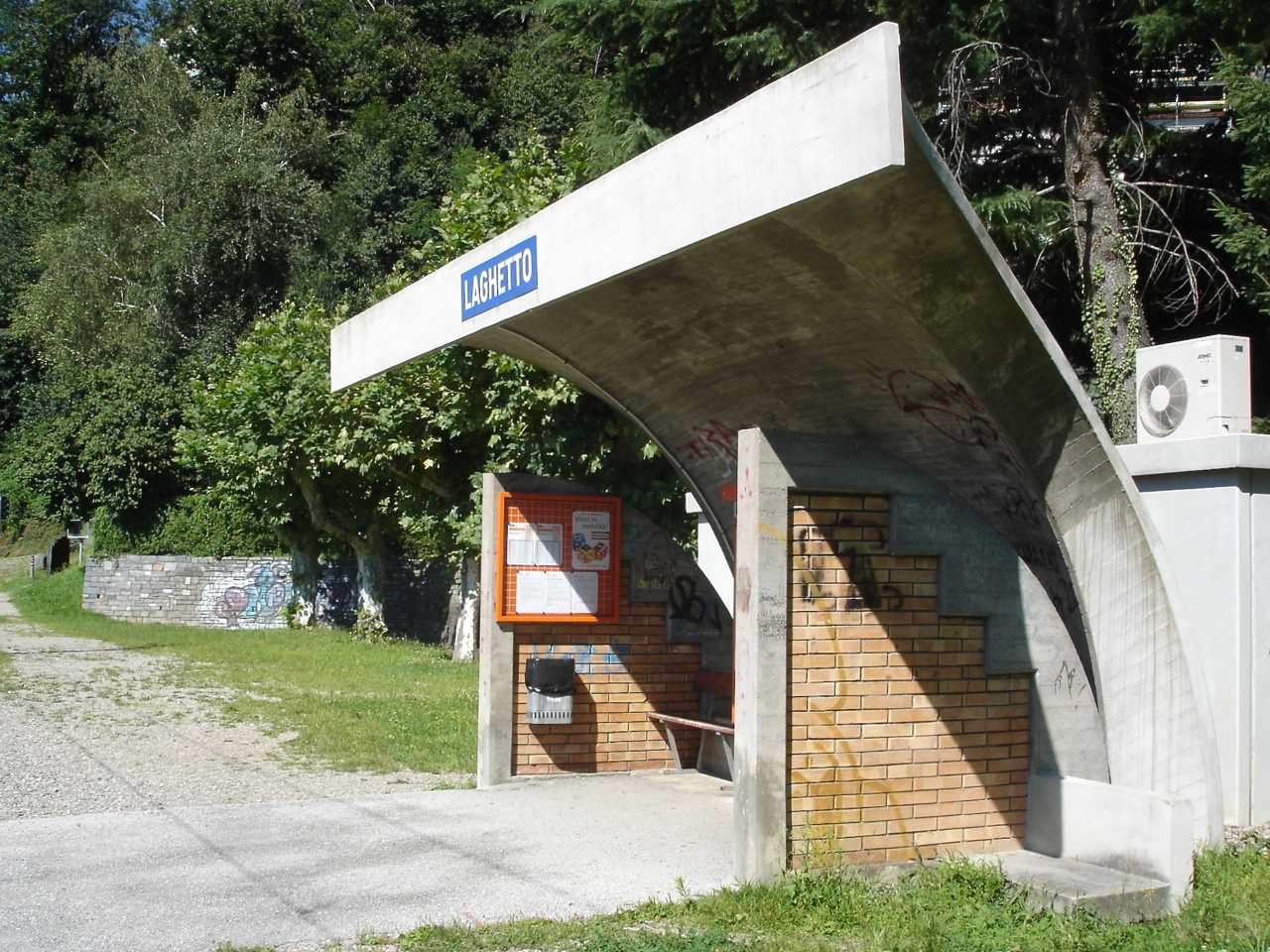
- The platform shelter in 2008

General information
- Location: Sorengo; Switzerland
- Coordinates: 45°59′49″N 8°56′00″E
- Elevation: 345 m (1,132 ft)
- Owner: Ferrovie Luganesi
- Line: Lugano–Ponte Tresa line
- Distance: 2.1 km (1.3 mi) from Lugano FLP
- Platforms: 1
- Train operators: Ferrovie Luganesi

Services
Preceding station	Ferrovie Luganesi	Following station
Cappella-Agnuzzo towards Ponte Tresa	S60	Sorengo towards Lugano FLP
Location
- Location within Switzerland Location within Canton of Ticino

Sorengo Laghetto railway station is a railway station in the municipality of Sorengo in the Swiss canton of Ticino. The station is on the metre gauge Lugano–Ponte Tresa railway (FLP), between Lugano and Ponte Tresa.

The station has a single platform, served by trains in both directions.

== Services ==
As of the December 2021 timetable change, the following services stop at Sorengo Laghetto:

- S60: service every fifteen minutes between Lugano FLP and Ponte Tresa on weekdays and half-hourly on weekends.
