= Agno railway station =

Railway station in Switzerland

Agno
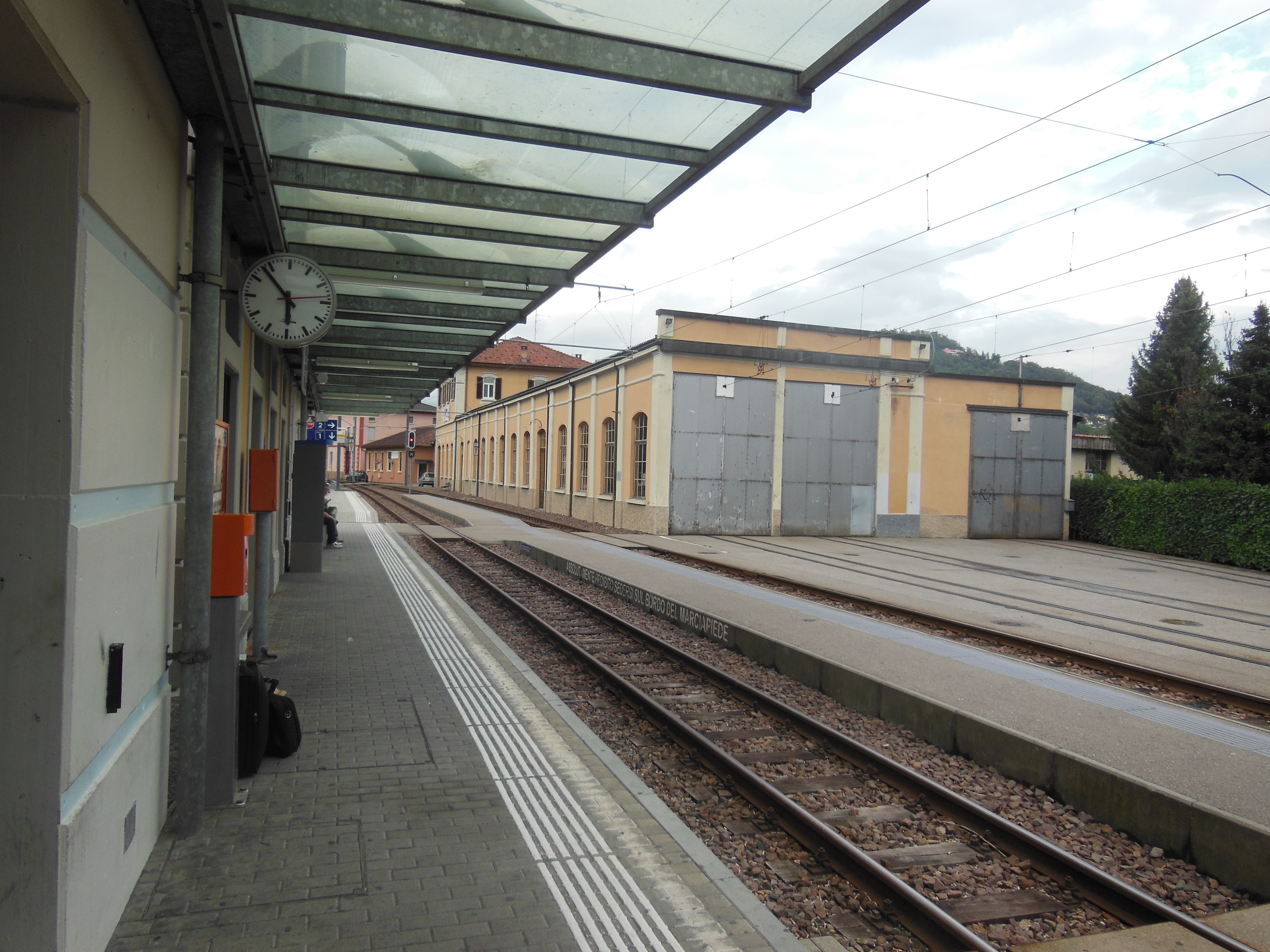
- The station platform looking north, with station building to left and depot entrance to right

General information
- Location: Agno; Switzerland
- Coordinates: 45°59′45″N 8°54′03″E
- Elevation: 274 m (899 ft) AMSL
- Owner: Ferrovie Luganesi
- Line: Lugano–Ponte Tresa line
- Distance: 7.7 km (4.8 mi) from Lugano FLP
- Platforms: 2
- Train operators: Ferrovie Luganesi
- Connections: Autopostale bus services; Lugano Airport (10 minute walk)

Services
Preceding station	Ferrovie Luganesi	Following station
Magliaso Paese towards Ponte Tresa	S60	Serocca towards Lugano FLP
Location
- Location within Switzerland Location within Canton of Ticino

Agno railway station is a railway station in the municipality of Agno in the Swiss canton of Ticino. The station is on the metre gauge Lugano–Ponte Tresa railway (FLP), between Lugano and Ponte Tresa.

Agno is the nearest station to Lugano Airport, and is a sign-posted 10-minute walk from the airport terminal.

The headquarters and main depot of the FLP adjoins the station. The station has a passing loop, although trains do not usually pass here in normal service. There is a single side platform which adjoins the station building, and a narrow centre platform allows passengers to board and alight from trains on the loop track.

The station was renovated and expanded between 1990 and 1992, and further work, including the enlargement of the centre platform, was undertaken in 2003.

== Services ==
As of the December 2021 timetable change, the following services stop at Agno:

- S60: service every fifteen minutes between Lugano FLP and Ponte Tresa on weekdays and half-hourly on weekends.

== Gallery ==
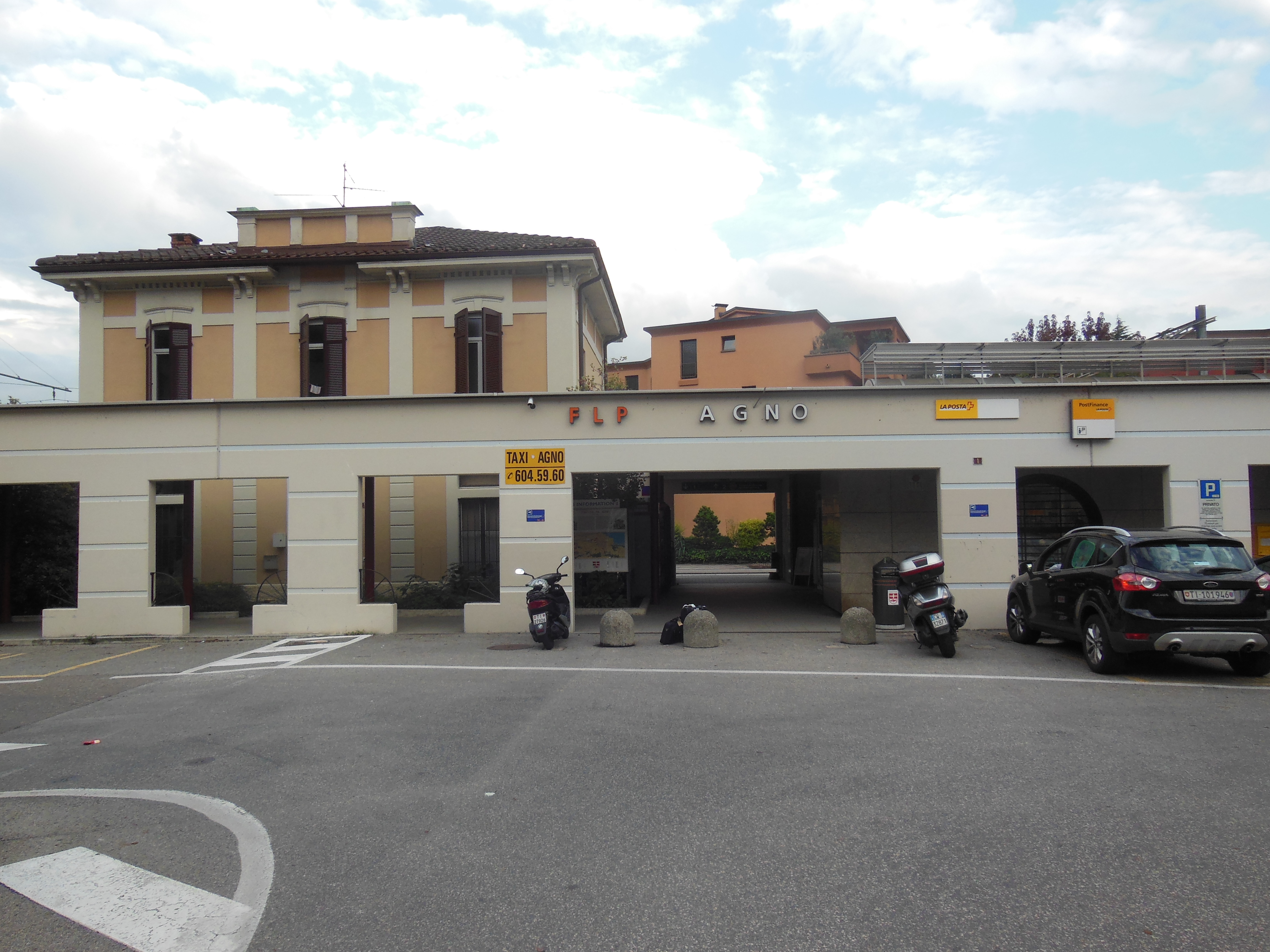
Station building from the street

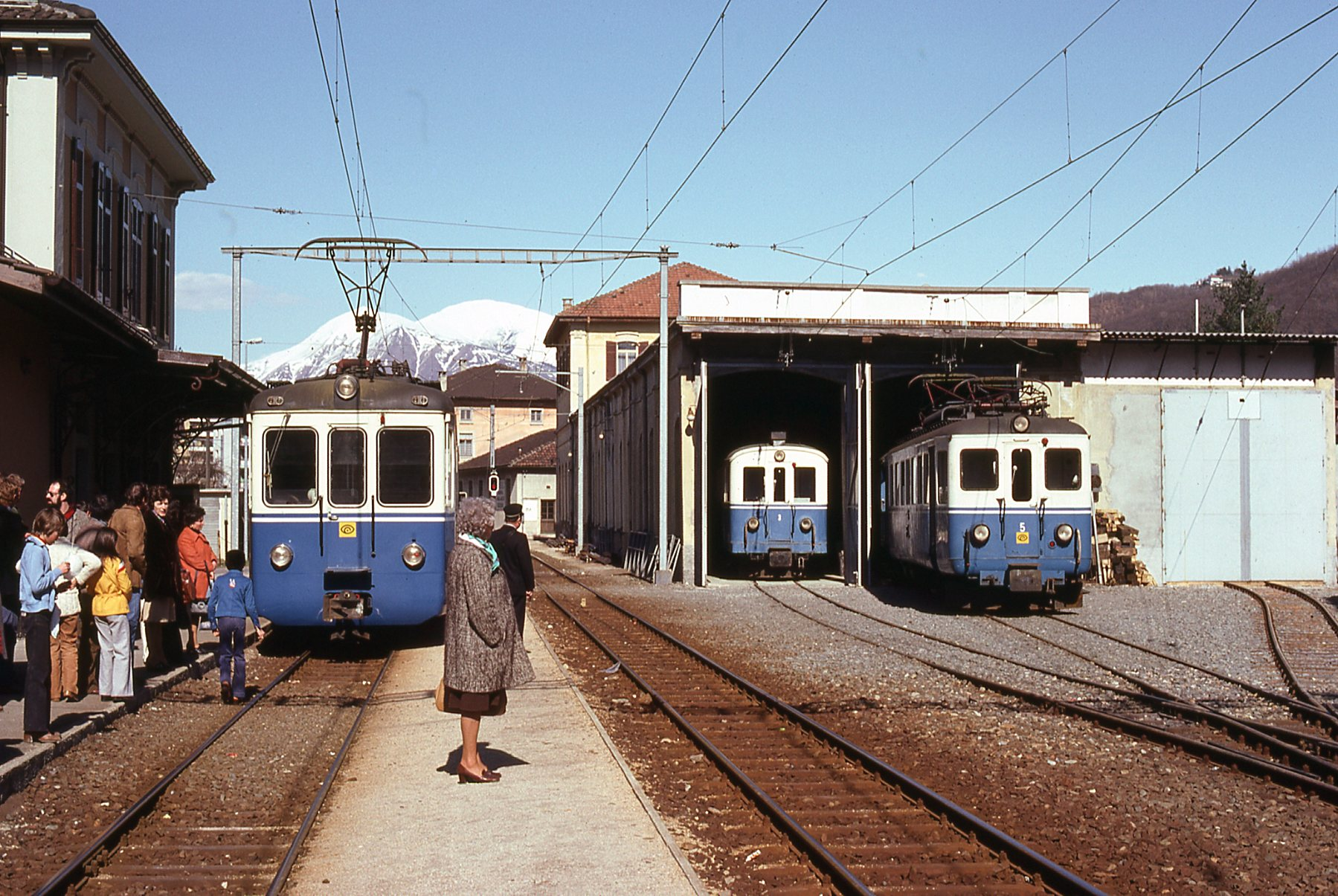
The station in 1978
