= Sorengo railway station =

Railway station in Sorengo, Ticino, Switzerland

Sorengo
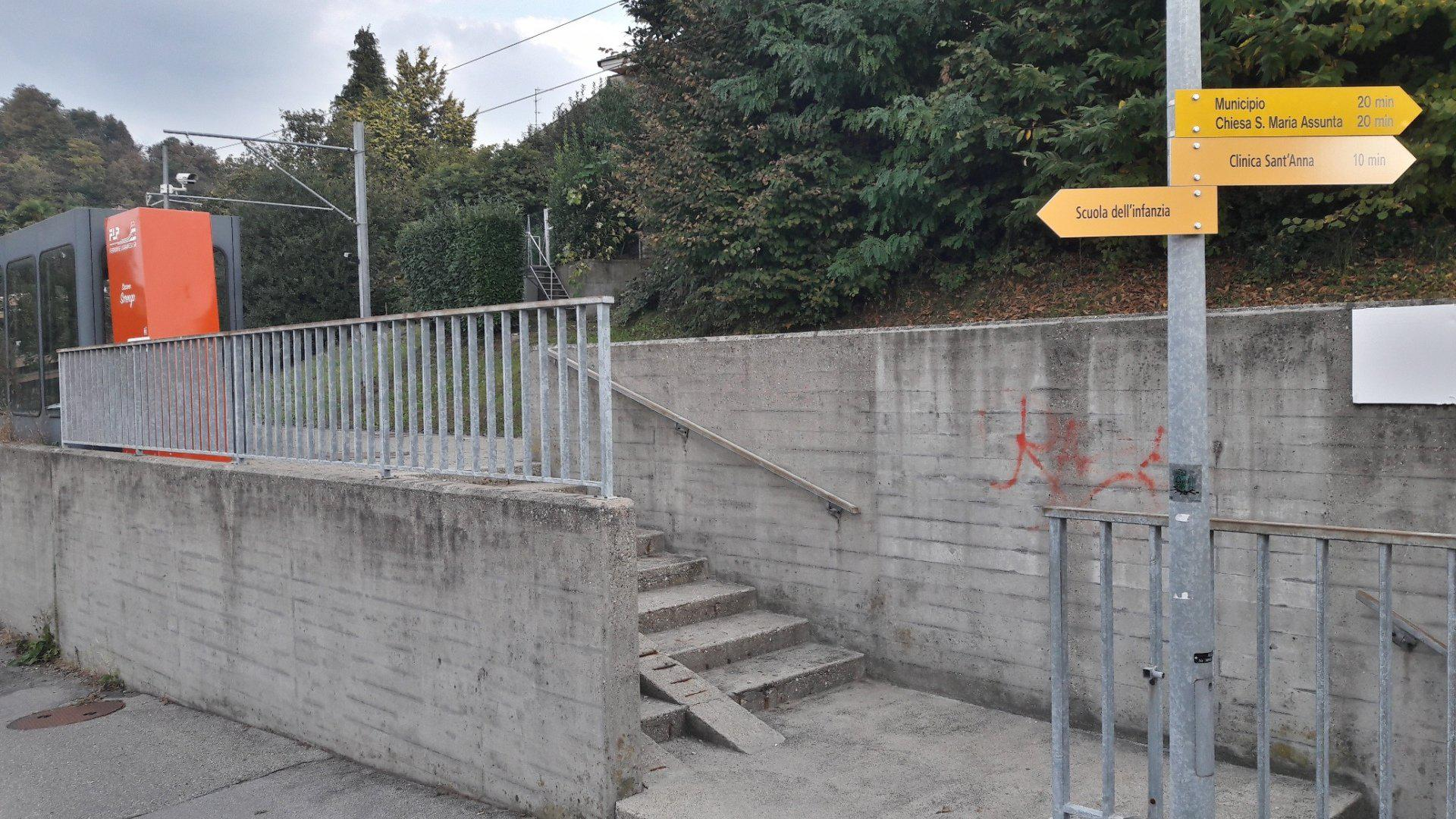
- The station platform in 2018

General information
- Location: Sorengo; Switzerland
- Coordinates: 46°00′01″N 8°56′05″E
- Elevation: 350 m (1,150 ft)
- Owner: Ferrovie Luganesi
- Line: Lugano–Ponte Tresa line
- Distance: 1.7 km (1.1 mi) from Lugano FLP
- Platforms: 1
- Train operators: Ferrovie Luganesi

Services
| Preceding station | Ferrovie Luganesi | Following station |
|---|---|---|
| Sorengo Laghetto towards Ponte Tresa | S60 | Lugano FLP Terminus |
Location
- Location within Switzerland Location within Canton of Ticino

Sorengo railway station is a railway station in the municipality of Sorengo in the Swiss canton of Ticino. The station is on the metre gauge Lugano–Ponte Tresa railway (FLP), between Lugano and Ponte Tresa.

The station has a single platform, served by trains in both directions.

== Services ==
As of the December 2021 timetable change, the following services stop at Sorengo:

- S60: service every fifteen minutes between Lugano FLP and Ponte Tresa on weekdays and half-hourly on weekends.
