= Caslano railway station =

Railway station in Ticino, Switzerland

Caslano
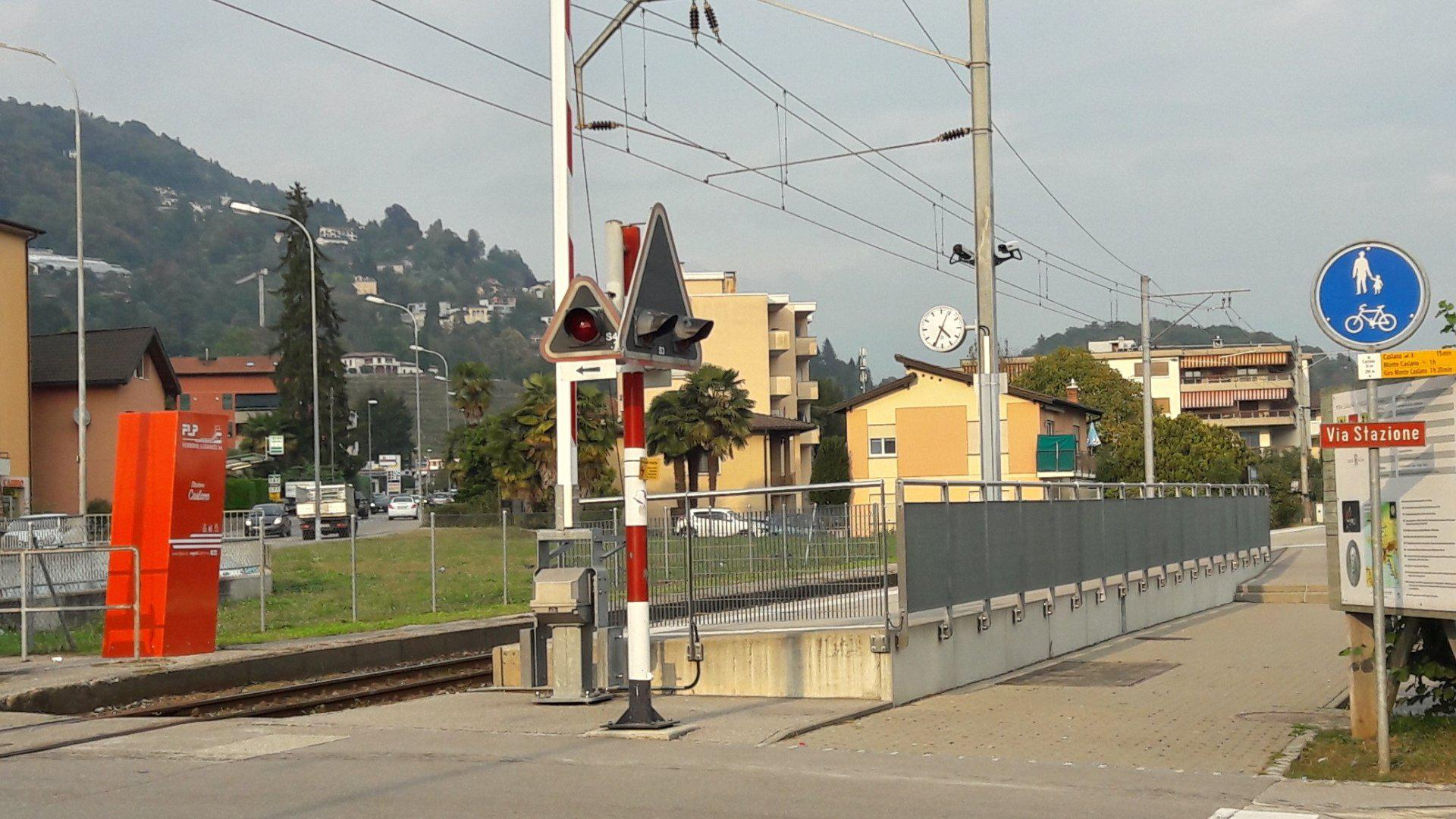
- The station platform in 2018

General information
- Location: Caslano; Switzerland
- Coordinates: 45°58′40″N 8°52′35″E
- Owner: Ferrovie Luganesi
- Line: Lugano–Ponte Tresa line
- Distance: 10.8 km (6.7 mi) from Lugano FLP
- Platforms: 1
- Train operators: Ferrovie Luganesi

Services
Preceding station	Ferrovie Luganesi	Following station
Ponte Tresa Terminus	S60	Magliaso towards Lugano FLP
Location
- Location within Switzerland Location within Canton of Ticino

Caslano railway station is a railway station in the municipality of Caslano in the Swiss canton of Ticino. The station is on the metre gauge Lugano–Ponte Tresa railway (FLP), between Lugano and Ponte Tresa.

The station has a single platform, which is used by trains operating in both directions.

== Services ==
As of the December 2021 timetable change, the following services stop at Caslano:

- S60: service every fifteen minutes between Lugano FLP and Ponte Tresa on weekdays and half-hourly on weekends.
