= Lugano Airport =

Lugano Airport Aeroporto di Lugano
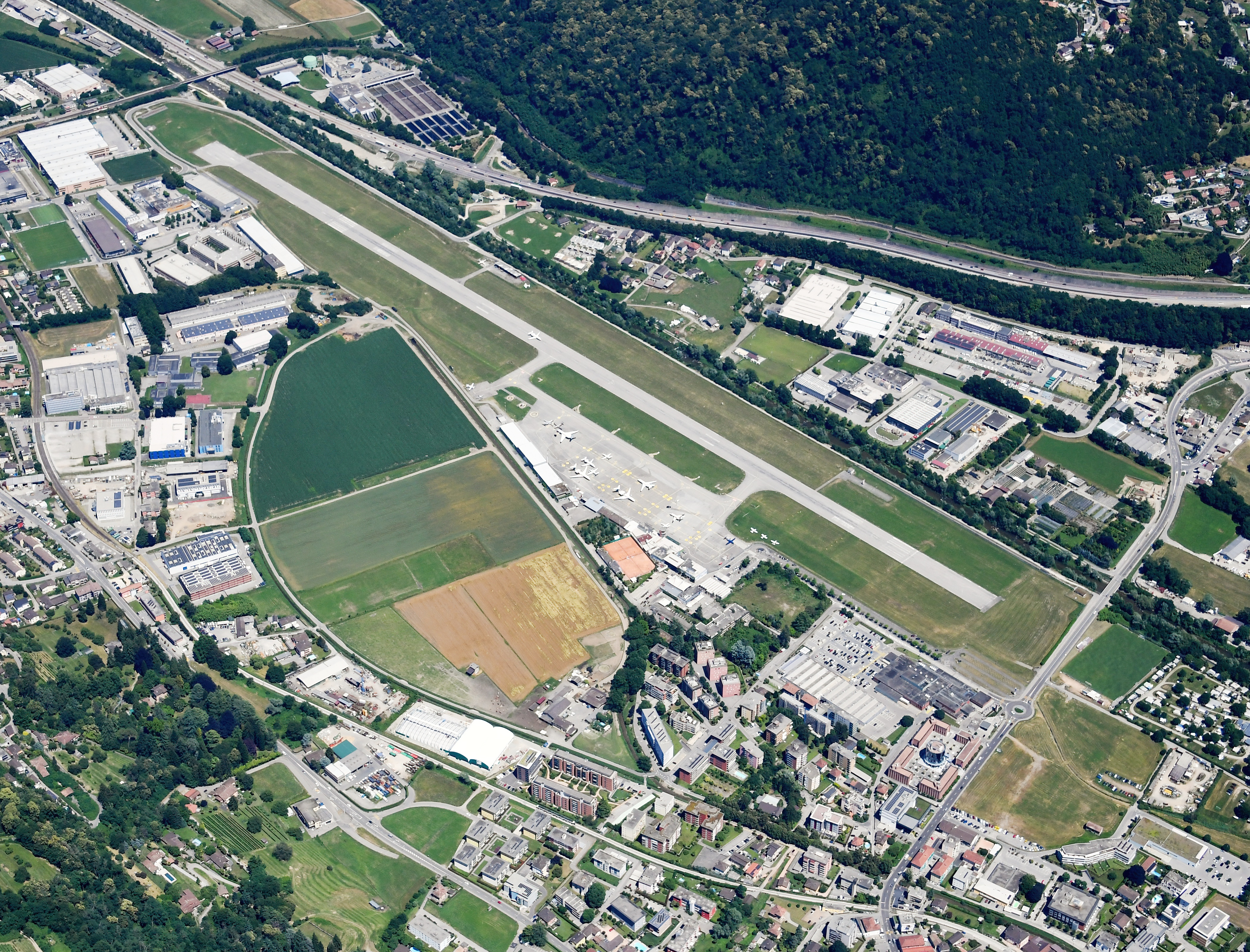
- IATA: LUG; ICAO: LSZA

Summary
- Airport type: Public AOE
- Owner: Lugano Airport SA
- Operator: Lugano Airport SA
- Serves: Lugano, Switzerland
- Location: Agno / Bioggio / Muzzano
- Elevation AMSL: 915 ft / 279 m
- Coordinates: 46°00′13″N 008°54′37″E
- Website: luganoairport.ch

Map
- Location of airport in Switzerland

Runways
Direction	Length		Surface
Direction	ft	m	Surface
01/19	4,658	1,420	Asphalt

Statistics (2018)
- Total passengers: 97,375
- Aircraft operations: 18,306
- Total cargo (metric tons): 46
- Source: Swiss AIP at EUROCONTROL; Statistics from Lugano Airport.

Lugano Airport (IATA: LUG, ICAO: LSZA) (Note: Italian: Aeroporto di Lugano, German: Flughafen Lugano-Agno, French: Aéroport de Lugano, Romansh: Eroport da Lugano) is a regional airport located 4 km (2.5 mi) west of the Swiss city of Lugano, approximately 80 km (50 mi) north of Milan, in the municipalities of Agno, Bioggio and Muzzano. It lies closer to the village of Agno than to Lugano itself, and is sometimes referred to as Lugano-Agno. Around 200,000 passengers use the airport each year, using approximately 2,400 flights. There are also limited freight operations, a flying club and flight school. The headquarters of Darwin Airline were located at the airport prior to its bankruptcy.

The airport is situated on land owned by the city of Lugano, whilst management is the responsibility of Lugano Airport SA, whose shares are owned by the canton of Ticino (12.5%) and the city (87.5%). The company has 73 employees, and an annual turnover of 10 million Swiss francs.

== History ==
The current location of the airport dates back to 1938, when it opened as a grass field. The first paved runway was laid in 1960, and originally had a length of 1,200 metres (3,900 ft) and a width of 30 metres (98 ft). Initially managed by private sector companies, the airport was taken over by the Azienda comunale dei trasporti della Città di Lugano, Lugano's municipal transport company, in 1974.

In the early 1980s, the airline Crossair decided to invest in the airport, establishing connections between Lugano and various European cities. In 1985, the runway was extended by 150 metres (490 ft), and in 1989 a new control tower became operational.

After the demise of Adria Airways in September 2019, which operated the route to Zürich Airport on behalf of Swiss International Air Lines, Lugano lost its sole year-round scheduled service as Swiss will refer its passengers to train services in the future without resuming the flights.

In April 2020, the company behind the airport serving Lugano, Switzerland opted to put itself into liquidation after the COVID-19 pandemic destroyed air traffic at the location.

== Facilities ==
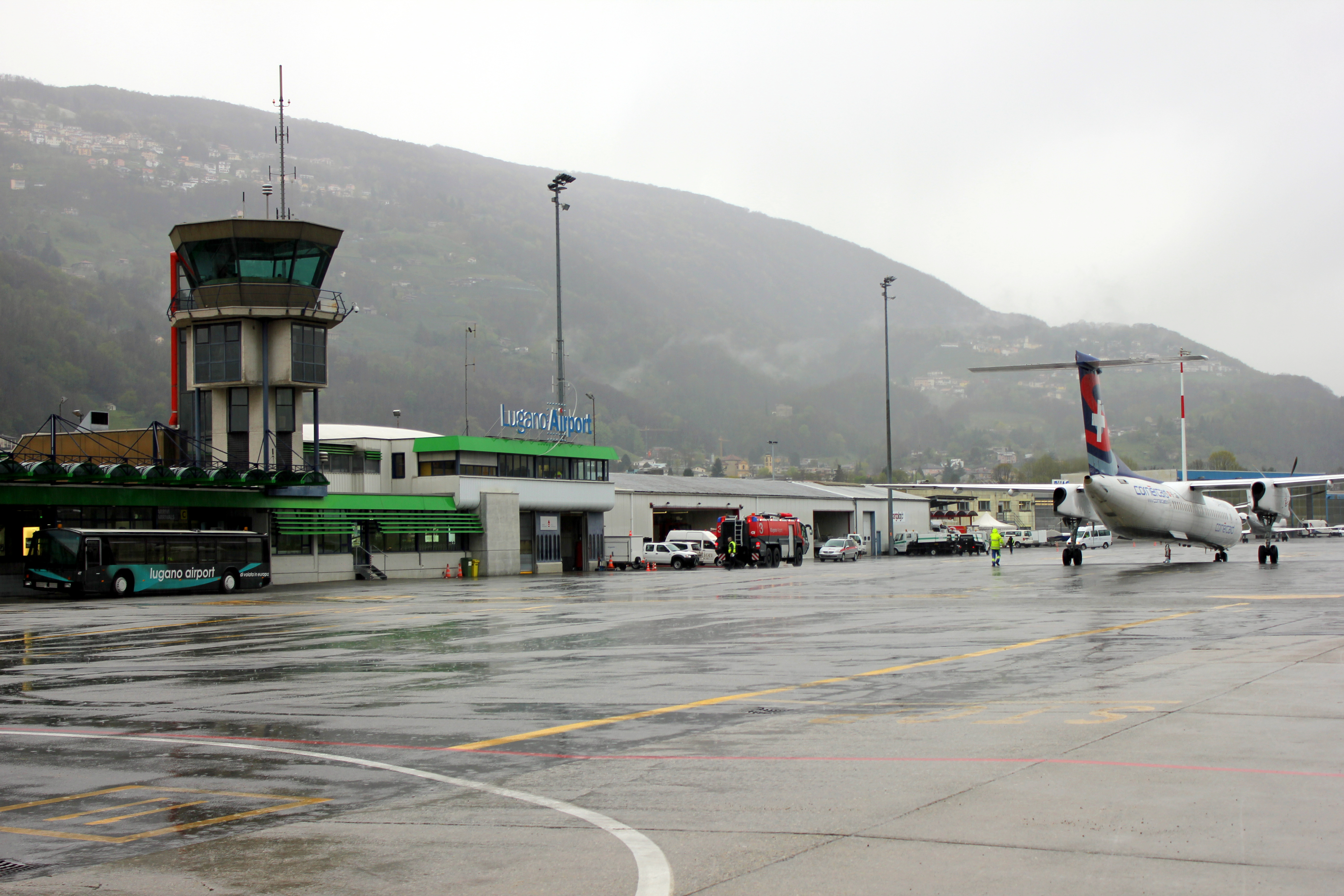
Apron overview

=== Terminal ===
The airport has a single passenger terminal building, with airline ticket and check-in desks, airport security and customs facilities. There is an air side departure lounge with duty-free shop, bar and snack bar. Boarding of aircraft is generally on foot across the apron, although sometimes buses are used when the aircraft is not parked directly next to the terminal building.

An adjacent building to the terminal building houses the ground side airport restaurant and flying club, with outdoor seating under an awning between the two buildings. Other ground side catering and shopping outlets are situated around an adjacent open courtyard.

=== Runway ===
The airport has a single, bidirectional runway with an asphalt surface, identified as 01/19. The runway is 1,420 metres (4,660 ft) long, 30 metres (98 ft) wide, and 279 metres (915 ft) above mean sea level. There is no parallel taxiway, and aircraft arrivals and departures often involve backtracking on the runway.

The airport's instrument approach procedure is quite challenging because of its steep angle of descent of 6.65°, more than double the standard approach angle of 3° and steeper than London City's 5.5°. This is due to its geographic location in the mouth of a valley.

== Airlines and destinations ==
As of March 2025, there are no regular flights scheduled to or from Lugano.

== Ground transportation ==
=== Road ===
The airport is some 6 kilometres (3.7 mi) from Lugano city centre by road, and a similar distance from the nearest junctions on the A2 motorway. It has both long and short term parking, a taxi rank, and a selection of car hire companies.

=== Train ===
A shuttle bus connects the airport with Lugano railway station and city centre, meeting most scheduled flights. Agno railway station is a sign-posted ten-minute walk from the airport, and trains connect to Lugano and Ponte Tresa every 15 minutes on weekdays or 30 minutes at weekends.

== See also ==
- Transport in Switzerland
