= Hendrikje Kühne & Beat Klein =

Music artist duo

Hendrikje Kühne and Beat Klein commonly referred to as Hendrikje Kühne & Beat Klein are a Swiss artist couple which is primarily active in the field of visual productions in various technologies primarily domesticated in the field of collage, sculpting and installations of photography, videography and publishing. Their joint artistic activity began in 1998.

== Hendrikje Kühne ==
Hendrikje Kühne
- Born: Hendrikje Kühne; February 19, 1962 (age 64); Darmstadt, West Germany (now Germany)
- Website: Official website

Henrikje Kühne (born February 19, 1962) is a German-born Swiss teacher and artist. She was born in Darmstadt, West Germany (present day Germany) and relocated to Basel, Switzerland in 1965 since her father found work in a chemical plant there. She studied art at the University of Applied Science School of Arts and Design. In 1985 she completed additional studies at University of Duisburg-Essen in Visual arts. Kühne ultimately became a drawing teacher working in various occupations and schools. In 1996, she received a scholarship to complete advanced studies at Cité Internationale des Arts Paris.

== Beat Klein ==
Beat Klein
- Born: Beat Klein; June 26, 1956 (age 69); Sorengo, Switzerland
- Website: Official website

Beat Klein (born June 26, 1956) is a Swiss artist. He completed his alma mater at College of Art and Design in Basel, Switzerland and was primarily active in sculpting. In 1991, he received a scholarship to complete advanced studies at Cité Internationale des Arts Paris. Since 1998 he works collaboratively with his partner Hendrikje Kühne.

== Exhibitions (selection) ==
- 1999 Kunst Raum Riehen, Basel-Stadt (CH); Hendrikje Kühne / Beat Klein (Katalog)
- 2000 Kunstverein Schwäbisch Hall (DE); Das Leben ist eine Fahrt ins Blaue
- 2000 Kunstraum Aarau (CH); Auf dem Berg / Im Wald / In der Stadt
- 2001 Temple Bar Gallery, Dublin (IE); A World of Difference (Katalog)
- 2001 Gasworks Gallery, London (GB): Life is a Mystery Tour (part II) (Katalog)
- 2002 The Gallery, St Peter Port, Guernsey (UK); Map of Paradise (Katalog)
- 2003 Kunstverein Springhornhof, Neuenkirchen (DE); Fokus 1 (Katalog und Stickerheft)
- 2007 M’ARS Centre for Contemporary Arts, Moskau (RU); Car Crush
- 2008 Sølyst Artist in Residence Center Jyderup (DK); The Garden, Birds and a Hedge
- 2009 Kunstmuseum Olten (CH): Wo sie herkommt, singen die Vögel schöne Lieder (Katalog)
- 2010 GIST Galerie, Amsterdam (NL): Painting Views
- 2011 Art Brussels (BE): Positions (Installation)
- 2012 GIST Galerie, Amsterdam (NL): Entrez!
- 2013 Pavel Zoubok Gallery, New York City (US): Somewhere only we know
- 2014 Galerie Graf&Schelble, Basel (CH): Die kennen wir vom Sehen
- 2016 Galerie Graf&Schelble, Basel (CH): Schauplätze
- 2017 The Garden of the Zodiac, Omaha/Nebraska (US): Where do you wonna go from here?
- 2018 Sherry Leedy Contemporary Art, Kansas City/Missouri (US): Places to Remember
- 2018 Musée jurassien des arts, Moutier (CH): Une heure dans le Jura (Stickerheft)
