= Magliaso =

- Municipality
- Flag Coat of arms
- Location of Magliaso
- Location within Switzerland Location within Canton of Ticino
- Coordinates: 45°59′N 8°53′E
- Country: Switzerland
- Canton: Ticino
- District: Lugano

Government
  - Mayor: Sindaco

Area
  - Total: 1.09 km^{2} (0.42 sq mi)
- Elevation: 287 m (942 ft)

Population (December 2004)
  - Total: 1,412
  - Density: 1,300/km^{2} (3,360/sq mi)
- Time zone: UTC+01:00 (CET)
  - Summer (DST): UTC+02:00 (CEST)
- Postal code: 6983
- SFOS number: 5193
- ISO 3166 code: CH-TI
- Surrounded by: Agno, Carabietta, Caslano, Collina d'Oro, Neggio, Pura
- Website: http://www.magliaso.ch SFSO statistics

Magliaso is a municipality in the district of Lugano in the canton of Ticino in Switzerland.

== History ==
Magliaso is first mentioned in 769 as de Maliacis. In 854 it was mentioned as de vico Maliaci.

During the Lombards era the monastery of San Pietro in Ciel d'Oro in Pavia possessed a farm in Magliaso. The origin of the old church of S. Quirico (mentioned in 1033) and the San Giorgio Castle is not known. It was the home for nearly two decades (1098–1117) for the schismatic bishop of Como, Landolfo Carcano, who was appointed by Emperor Henry IV against Pope Gregory VII's bishop. The castle was besieged and conquered in 1117 by Como and the fate of Landolfo is uncertain (possibly deported or murdered). This caused the ten-year war between Como and Milan. The romanesque fresco on the south tower dates from around the same time and is one of the few secular romanesque works in Switzerland. In the 13th century the castle passed into the possession of a branch of the Rusca family of Como. Carlo Corrado Beroldingen, Chancellor of the bailiwick of Lugano, acquired the sovereign rights over the village in 1668. He had the parish church built and replaced the decaying ruins of the castle with an ornate palace.

There used to be many isolated farms and mills along the irrigation canal, which is typical for the pre-industrial economy. The municipality experienced a strong migration into Lombardy, South America and up through the 2nd World War into Central Switzerland. The always meager possessions of Vicinanza were sold in 1863. At the beginning of the 21st century, large swathes of the valley and along the lake were covered with new, primarily residential, developments. While the services sector is the major industry in Magliaso, the tourist infrastructure has remained modest. The landscape is dominated by the lake, and in an area at the foot of the mountain, a golf course was built.

== Geography ==
Aerial view (1950)

Magliaso has an area, as of 1997, of 1.09 square kilometers (0.42 sq mi). Of this area, 0.73 km^{2} (0.28 sq mi) or 67.0% is used for agricultural purposes, while 0.1 km^{2} (0.039 sq mi) or 9.2% is forested. Of the rest of the land, 0.77 km^{2} (0.30 sq mi) or 70.6% is settled (buildings or roads), 0.03 km^{2} (7.4 acres) or 2.8% is either rivers or lakes.

Of the built up area, housing and buildings made up 48.6% and transportation infrastructure made up 11.9%. while parks, green belts and sports fields made up 9.2%. Out of the forested land, 4.6% of the total land area is heavily forested and 4.6% is covered with orchards or small clusters of trees. Of the agricultural land, 12.8% is used for growing crops, while 5.5% is used for orchards or vine crops and 48.6% is used for alpine pastures. Of the water in the municipality, 0.9% is in lakes and 1.8% is in rivers and streams.

The municipality is located in the Lugano district, north of the Magliasina delta. It consists of the villages of Magliaso, below the church and castle, and Castellaccio, on the lake shore.

== Coat of arms ==
The blazon of the municipal coat of arms is Quartered or in first and fourth two mullets of the same on an orb azure with a cross sable and in second and third also or a lion rampant sable scarfed azure.

== Demographics ==
Magliaso has a population (as of December 2020) of 1,600. As of 2008, 19.9% of the population are resident foreign nationals. Over the last 10 years (1997–2007) the population has changed at a rate of 5.8%.

Most of the population (as of 2000) speaks Italian (77.4%), with German being second most common (15.2%) and French being third (2.2%). Of the Swiss national languages (as of 2000), 206 speak German, 30 people speak French, 1,052 people speak Italian, and 1 person speaks Romansh. The remainder (70 people) speak another language.

As of 2008, the gender distribution of the population was 46.8% male and 53.2% female. The population was made up of 514 Swiss men (35.0% of the population), and 173 (11.8%) non-Swiss men. There were 643 Swiss women (43.8%), and 137 (9.3%) non-Swiss women.

In 2008 there were 3 live births to Swiss citizens and 4 births to non-Swiss citizens, and in same time span there were 12 deaths of Swiss citizens and 5 non-Swiss citizen deaths. Ignoring immigration and emigration, the population of Swiss citizens decreased by 9 while the foreign population decreased by 1. There were 4 Swiss men who emigrated from Switzerland. At the same time, there were 6 non-Swiss men and 3 non-Swiss women who immigrated from another country to Switzerland. The total Swiss population change in 2008 (from all sources, including moves across municipal borders) was a decrease of 3 and the non-Swiss population change was a decrease of 11 people. This represents a population growth rate of -1.0%.

The age distribution, as of 2009, in Magliaso is; 136 children or 9.3% of the population are between 0 and 9 years old and 157 teenagers or 10.7% are between 10 and 19. Of the adult population, 118 people or 8.0% of the population are between 20 and 29 years old. 203 people or 13.8% are between 30 and 39, 223 people or 15.2% are between 40 and 49, and 214 people or 14.6% are between 50 and 59. The senior population distribution is 193 people or 13.2% of the population are between 60 and 69 years old, 141 people or 9.6% are between 70 and 79, there are 82 people or 5.6% who are over 80.

As of 2000, there were 553 private households in the municipality, and an average of 2.4 persons per household. In 2000 there were 389 single family homes (or 80.4% of the total) out of a total of 484 inhabited buildings. There were 44 two family buildings (9.1%) and 27 multi-family buildings (5.6%). There were also 24 buildings in the municipality that were multipurpose buildings (used for both housing and commercial or another purpose).

The vacancy rate for the municipality, in 2008, was 0.57%. In 2000 there were 658 apartments in the municipality. The most common apartment size was the 4 room apartment of which there were 227. There were 22 single room apartments and 198 apartments with five or more rooms. Of these apartments, a total of 549 apartments (83.4% of the total) were permanently occupied, while 87 apartments (13.2%) were seasonally occupied and 22 apartments (3.3%) were empty. As of 2007, the construction rate of new housing units was 10.2 new units per 1000 residents.

The historical population is given in the following chart:

== Heritage sites of national significance ==
The S. Giorgio Castle is listed as a Swiss heritage site of national significance.

== Politics ==
In the 2007 federal election the most popular party was the FDP which received 23.85% of the vote. The next three most popular parties were the CVP (23.35%), the Ticino League (19.01%) and the SP (16.73%). In the federal election, a total of 418 votes were cast, and the voter turnout was 42.8%.

In the 2007 Gran Consiglio election, there were a total of 966 registered voters in Magliaso, of which 504 or 52.2% voted. 6 blank ballots were cast, leaving 498 valid ballots in the election. The most popular party was the PLRT which received 103 or 20.7% of the vote. The next three most popular parties were; the PPD+GenGiova (with 92 or 18.5%), the PS (with 87 or 17.5%) and the PS (with 87 or 17.5%).

In the 2007 Consiglio di Stato election, 7 blank ballots were cast, leaving 497 valid ballots in the election. The most popular party was the LEGA which received 113 or 22.7% of the vote. The next three most popular parties were; the PLRT (with 96 or 19.3%), the PLRT (with 96 or 19.3%) and the PS (with 87 or 17.5%).

== Economy ==
As of 2007, Magliaso had an unemployment rate of 4.24%. As of 2005, there were 6 people employed in the primary economic sector and about 3 businesses involved in this sector. 105 people were employed in the secondary sector and there were 11 businesses in this sector. 238 people were employed in the tertiary sector, with 47 businesses in this sector. There were 602 residents of the municipality who were employed in some capacity, of which females made up 43.5% of the workforce.

In 2000, there were 433 workers who commuted into the municipality and 467 workers who commuted away. The municipality is a net exporter of workers, with about 1.1 workers leaving the municipality for every one entering. About 24.0% of the workforce coming into Magliaso are coming from outside Switzerland, while 0.4% of the locals commute out of Switzerland for work. Of the working population, 13.8% used public transportation to get to work, and 60.1% used a private car.

As of 2009, there were 2 hotels in Magliaso.

== Religion ==
From the 2000 census, 979 or 72.0% were Roman Catholic, while 159 or 11.7% belonged to the Swiss Reformed Church. There are 152 individuals (or about 11.18% of the population) who belong to another church (not listed on the census), and 69 individuals (or about 5.08% of the population) did not answer the question.

== Education ==
The entire Swiss population is generally well educated. In Magliaso about 71.9% of the population (between age 25 and 64) have completed either non-mandatory upper secondary education or additional higher education (either university or a Fachhochschule).

In Magliaso there were a total of 226 students (as of 2009). The Ticino education system provides up to three years of non-mandatory kindergarten and in Magliaso there were 35 children in kindergarten. The primary school program lasts for five years and includes both a standard school and a special school. In the municipality, 72 students attended the standard primary schools and 2 students attended the special school. In the lower secondary school system, students either attend a two-year middle school followed by a two-year pre-apprenticeship or they attend a four-year program to prepare for higher education. There were 47 students in the two-year middle school, while 35 students were in the four-year advanced program.

The upper secondary school includes several options, but at the end of the upper secondary program, a student will be prepared to enter a trade or to continue on to a university or college. In Ticino, vocational students may either attend school while working on their internship or apprenticeship (which takes three or four years) or may attend school followed by an internship or apprenticeship (which takes one year as a full-time student or one and a half to two years as a part-time student). There were 14 vocational students who were attending school full-time and 19 who attend part-time.

The professional program lasts three years and prepares a student for a job in engineering, nursing, computer science, business, tourism and similar fields. There were 2 students in the professional program.

As of 2000, there were 78 students in Magliaso who came from another municipality, while 127 residents attended schools outside the municipality.

== Transport ==
Magliaso is served by Magliaso station and Magliaso Paese station, on the metre gauge Lugano–Ponte Tresa railway that connects to Lugano. Both stations are served by regular trains, operating every 15 minutes during weekday daytime, and every half-hour at other times. Magliaso station is also served by Autopostale buses to Novaggio. Lugano Airport is located only 3 kilometers from the town of Magliaso
