= Sorengo =

- Municipality
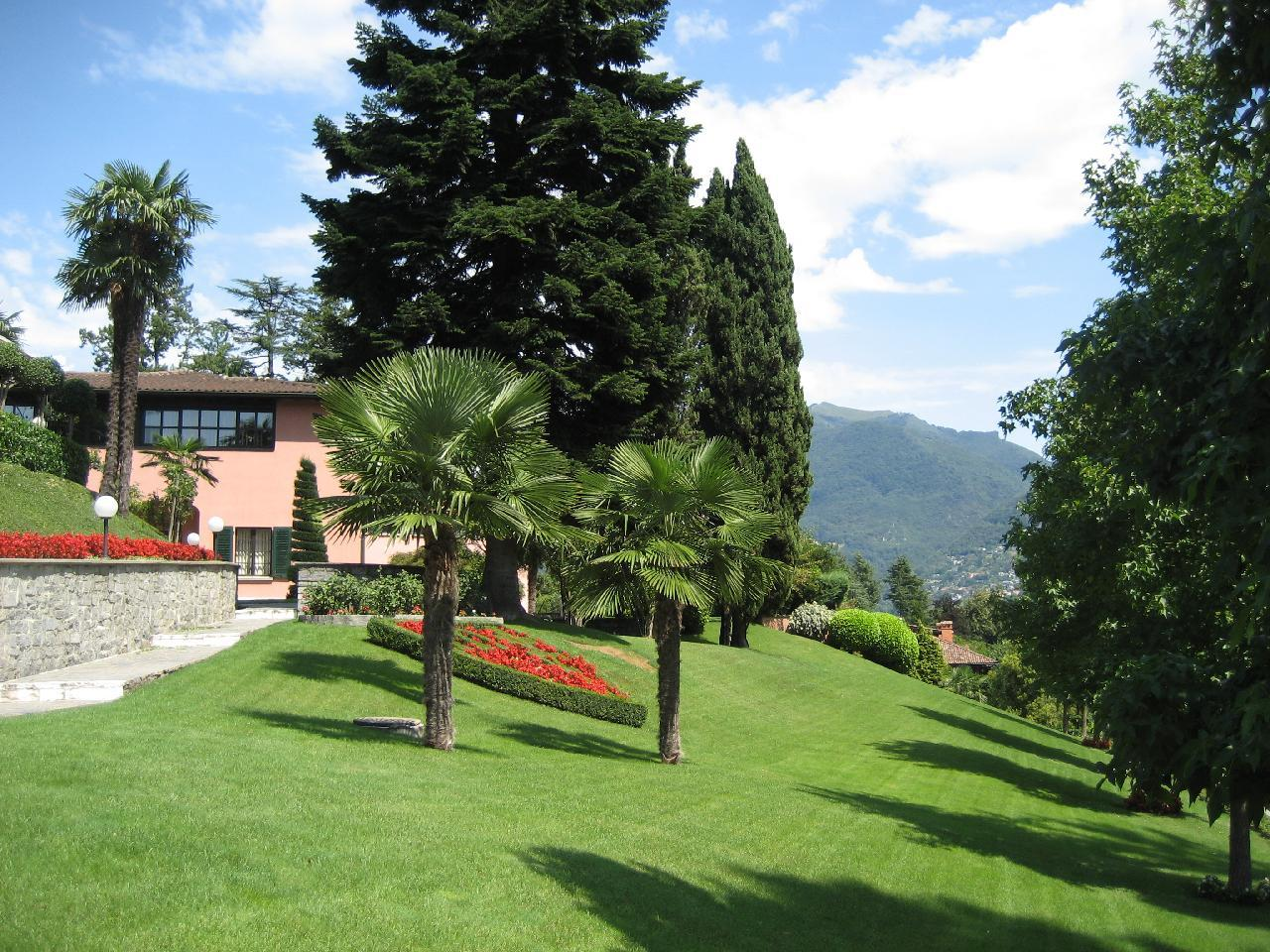

- Flag Coat of arms
- Location of Sorengo
- Location within Switzerland Location within Canton of Ticino
- Coordinates: 46°00′N 8°56′E
- Country: Switzerland
- Canton: Ticino
- District: Lugano

Government
  - Mayor: Sindaco

Area
  - Total: 0.85 km^{2} (0.33 sq mi)
- Elevation: 430 m (1,410 ft)

Population (December 2004)
  - Total: 1,592
  - Density: 1,900/km^{2} (4,900/sq mi)
- Time zone: UTC+01:00 (CET)
  - Summer (DST): UTC+02:00 (CEST)
- Postal code: 6924
- SFOS number: 5225
- ISO 3166 code: CH-TI
- Surrounded by: Collina d'Oro, Lugano, Muzzano
- Website: www.sorengo.ch

Sorengo is a municipality in the district of Lugano in the canton of Ticino in Switzerland.

== History ==
Sorengo was first mentioned in 1189 as Sourengo when the S. Lorenzo Cathedral in Lugano acquired the right to collect tithes.

In the Late Middle Ages a number of groups owned land or rights in Sorengo including; the monastery of S. Abbondio in Como (from 1265), Como Cathedral (mentioned in 1298), and various important family, including the Torriani and Rusca. Sorengo was first mentioned as an independent municipality in 1298, and the settlement of Cortivallo had partial independence into the 18th century. Sorengeo alternated with Lugano and Loreto as the meeting place of the General Council of the city and valley of Lugano. It was used by the Council in the 16th century, in 1687 and again in 1696.

The inhabitants of Sorengo were part of the parish of Lugano, until 1776 when they became a separate parish. The church of S. Maria Assunta dates back to about the end of the 11th century back, but is not mentioned until 1298. It was expanded in 1566–1593, then rebuilt several times, and renovated in 1975-76 and 1980–81. In 1565 some monks from Bigorio founded a Capuchin monastery by the church, which moved in 1653 to Lugano and is now known as SS. Trinità Monastery.

Since the 1950s, Sorengo has transformed from a rural village into a commuter town for the agglomeration of Lugano. Several organizations have settled in Sorengo including; the children's charity Opera per l'assistenza alla ticinese fanciullezza (since 1920), the S. Anna Hospital (since 1934) and the American private university, Franklin University Switzerland (since 1986). In 2005, 96% of jobs in the municipality were in the services sector.

== Geography ==
Sorengo has an area, as of 1997, of 0.85 square kilometers (0.33 sq mi). Of this area, 0.56 km^{2} (0.22 sq mi) or 65.9% is used for agricultural purposes, while 0.13 km^{2} (0.050 sq mi) or 15.3% is forested. Of the rest of the land, 0.5 km^{2} (0.19 sq mi) or 58.8% is settled (buildings or roads) and 0.02 km^{2} (4.9 acres) or 2.4% is unproductive land.

Of the built up area, housing and buildings made up 40.0% and transportation infrastructure made up 14.1%. Power and water infrastructure as well as other special developed areas made up 2.4% of the area while parks, green belts and sports fields made up 2.4%. Out of the forested land, 9.4% of the total land area is heavily forested and 5.9% is covered with orchards or small clusters of trees. Of the agricultural land, 24.7% is used for growing crops, while 1.2% is used for orchards or vine crops and 40.0% is used for alpine pastures.

The municipality is located in the Lugano district, on the heights between Lake Lugano and Lago di Muzzano. It consists of the village of Sorengo with the village sections of Cortivallo and Cremignone. Lago di Muzzano is shared with the neighboring municipalities.

== Coat of arms ==
The blazon of the municipal coat of arms is Vert a chestnut tree eradicated or surrounded with four robins proper reguardant towards it.

== Demographics ==
Sorengo has a population (as of December 2020) of 1,863. As of 2008, 33.5% of the population are resident foreign nationals. Over the last 10 years (1997–2007) the population has changed at a rate of 15.3%.

Most of the population (as of 2000) speaks Italian (83.5%), with German being second most common (7.8%) and French being third (3.1%). Of the Swiss national languages (as of 2000), 122 speak German, 48 people speak French, 1,300 people speak Italian, and 1 person speaks Romansh. The remainder (86 people) speak another language.

As of 2008, the gender distribution of the population was 45.5% male and 54.5% female. The population was made up of 522 Swiss men (29.8% of the population), and 276 (15.8%) non-Swiss men. There were 650 Swiss women (37.1%), and 304 (17.4%) non-Swiss women.

In 2008 there were 17 live births to Swiss citizens and 2 births to non-Swiss citizens, and in same time span there were 12 deaths of Swiss citizens and 4 non-Swiss citizen deaths. Ignoring immigration and emigration, the population of Swiss citizens increased by 5 while the foreign population decreased by 2. There were 5 Swiss men and 4 Swiss women who immigrated back to Switzerland. At the same time, there were 40 non-Swiss men and 40 non-Swiss women who immigrated from another country to Switzerland. The total Swiss population change in 2008 (from all sources, including moves across municipal borders) was an increase of 5 and the non-Swiss population change was an increase of 60 people. This represents a population growth rate of 3.8%.

The age distribution, as of 2009, in Sorengo is; 151 children or 8.6% of the population are between 0 and 9 years old and 252 teenagers or 14.4% are between 10 and 19. Of the adult population, 268 people or 15.3% of the population are between 20 and 29 years old. 197 people or 11.2% are between 30 and 39, 266 people or 15.2% are between 40 and 49, and 216 people or 12.3% are between 50 and 59. The senior population distribution is 204 people or 11.6% of the population are between 60 and 69 years old, 125 people or 7.1% are between 70 and 79, there are 73 people or 4.2% who are over 80.

As of 2000, there were 618 private households in the municipality, and an average of 2.3 persons per household. In 2000 there were 163 single family homes (or 52.4% of the total) out of a total of 311 inhabited buildings. There were 62 two family buildings (19.9%) and 63 multi-family buildings (20.3%). There were also 23 buildings in the municipality that were multipurpose buildings (used for both housing and commercial or another purpose).

The vacancy rate for the municipality, in 2008, was 0.26%. In 2000 there were 708 apartments in the municipality. The most common apartment size was the 5 room apartment of which there were 228. There were 42 single room apartments and 228 apartments with five or more rooms. Of these apartments, a total of 614 apartments (86.7% of the total) were permanently occupied, while 46 apartments (6.5%) were seasonally occupied and 48 apartments (6.8%) were empty. As of 2007, the construction rate of new housing units was 18.2 new units per 1000 residents.

The historical population is given in the following chart:

== Politics ==
In the 2007 federal election the most popular party was the FDP which received 30.75% of the vote. The next three most popular parties were the CVP (28.68%), the SP (16.19%) and the SVP (9.25%). In the federal election, a total of 553 votes were cast, and the voter turnout was 56.6%.

In the 2007 Gran Consiglio election, there were a total of 964 registered voters in Sorengo, of which 668 or 69.3% voted. 13 blank ballots and 3 null ballots were cast, leaving 652 valid ballots in the election. The most popular party was the PPD+GenGiova which received 167 or 25.6% of the vote. The next three most popular parties were; the PLRT (with 146 or 22.4%), the PS (with 107 or 16.4%) and the LEGA (with 80 or 12.3%).

In the 2007 Consiglio di Stato election, 6 blank ballots and 2 null ballots were cast, leaving 660 valid ballots in the election. The most popular party was the PPD which received 164 or 24.8% of the vote. The next three most popular parties were; the PLRT (with 141 or 21.4%), the PS (with 133 or 20.2%) and the LEGA (with 109 or 16.5%).

== Economy ==
As of 2007, Sorengo had an unemployment rate of 3.41%. As of 2005, there were 19 people employed in the primary economic sector and about 1 business involved in this sector. 25 people were employed in the secondary sector and there were 4 businesses in this sector. 950 people were employed in the tertiary sector, with 56 businesses in this sector. There were 742 residents of the municipality who were employed in some capacity, of which females made up 43.0% of the workforce.

In 2000, there were 1,046 workers who commuted into the municipality and 575 workers who commuted away. The municipality is a net importer of workers, with about 1.8 workers entering the municipality for every one leaving. About 19.2% of the workforce coming into Sorengo are coming from outside Switzerland, while 0.2% of the locals commute out of Switzerland for work. Of the working population, 10.8% used public transportation to get to work, and 55.1% used a private car.

== Religion ==
From the 2000 census, 1,184 or 76.0% were Roman Catholic, while 110 or 7.1% belonged to the Swiss Reformed Church. There are 186 individuals (or about 11.95% of the population) who belong to another church (not listed on the census), and 77 individuals (or about 4.95% of the population) did not answer the question.

== Education ==
In Sorengo about 75.1% of the population (between age 25 and 64) have completed either non-mandatory upper secondary education or additional higher education (either university or a Fachhochschule).

In Sorengo there were a total of 215 students (as of 2009). The Ticino education system provides up to three years of non-mandatory kindergarten and in Sorengo there were 48 children in kindergarten. The primary school program lasts for five years and includes both a standard school and a special school. In the municipality, 63 students attended the standard primary schools and 2 students attended the special school. In the lower secondary school system, students either attend a two-year middle school followed by a two-year pre-apprenticeship or they attend a four-year program to prepare for higher education. There were 57 students in the two-year middle school, while 22 students were in the four-year advanced program.

The upper secondary school includes several options, but at the end of the upper secondary program, a student will be prepared to enter a trade or to continue on to a university or college. In Ticino, vocational students may either attend school while working on their internship or apprenticeship (which takes three or four years) or may attend school followed by an internship or apprenticeship (which takes one year as a full-time student or one and a half to two years as a part-time student). There were 11 vocational students who were attending school full-time and 8 who attend part-time.

The professional program lasts three years and prepares a student for a job in engineering, nursing, computer science, business, tourism and similar fields. There were 4 students in the professional program.

As of 2000, there were 331 students in Sorengo who came from another municipality, while 165 residents attended schools outside the municipality.

== Transport ==
Sorengo is served by Sorengo station and Sorengo Laghetto station on the Lugano–Ponte Tresa railway. Both stations are served by regular trains, operating every 15 minutes during weekday daytime, and every half hour at other times. Sorengo is also served by buses of the Trasporti Pubblici Luganesi and Autopostale.
