= Lugano–Ponte Tresa Railway =

Narrow gauge railway in canton of Ticino, Switzerland

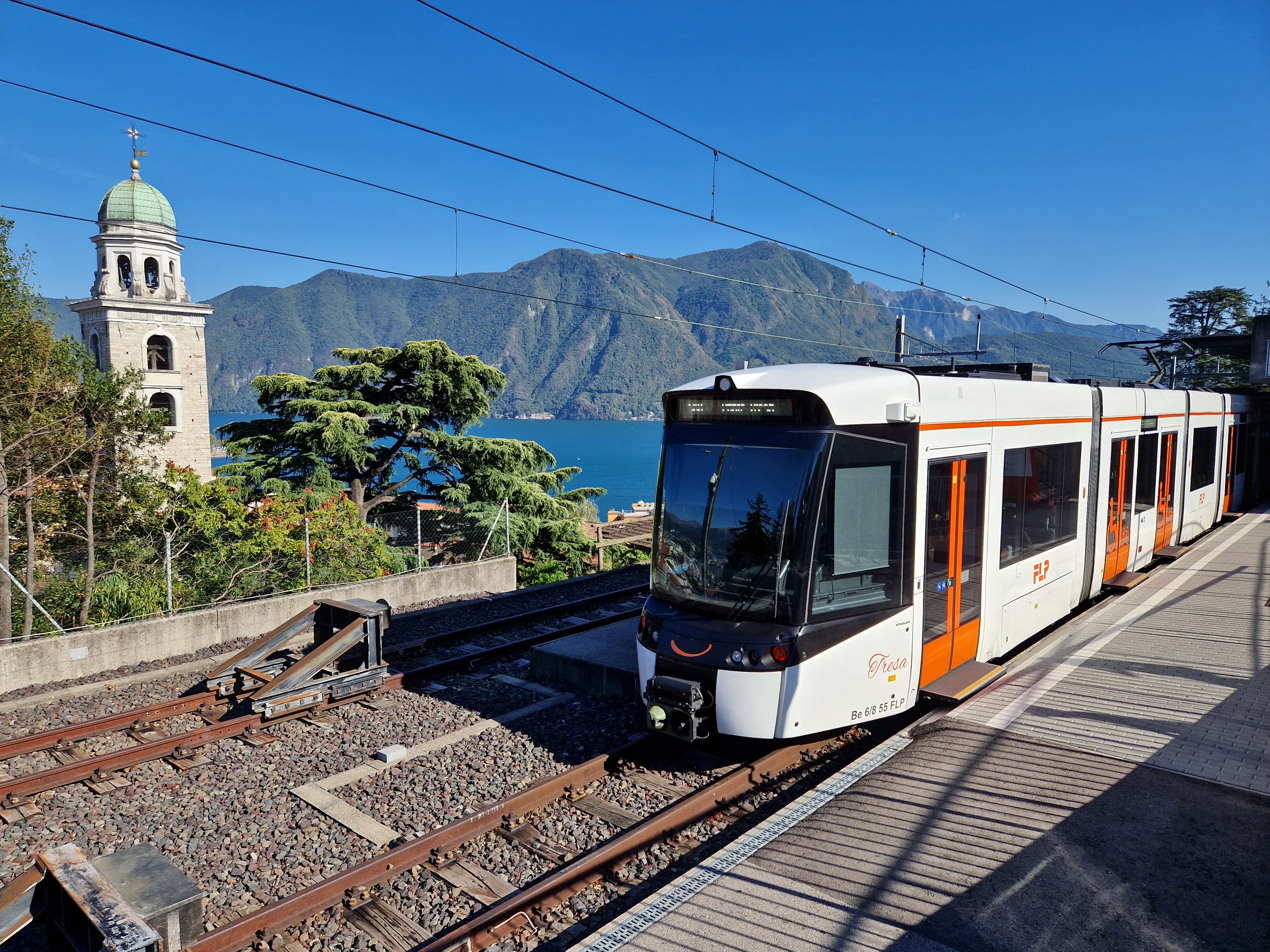
- FLP train in Lugano railway station

Overview
- Native name: Ferrovia Lugano–Ponte Tresa
- Owner: Ferrovie Luganesi

Technical
- Line length: 12.3 km (7.6 mi)
- Track gauge: Metre (3 ft 3 3/8 in)
- Electrification: 1200 V, DC Overhead
Route map
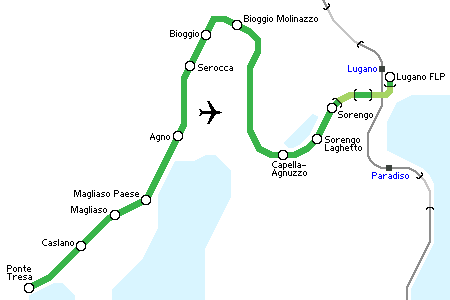
- Source: Swiss railway atlas

The Lugano–Ponte Tresa Railway or Ferrovia Lugano–Ponte Tresa (FLP) is a local railway line in the Italian speaking canton of Ticino, in south-east Switzerland. The line links the town of Lugano with Ponte Tresa, and is 12.3 kilometres (7.6 mi) long. It is built to metre gauge (3 ft 3 3/8 in gauge), and is electrified on the overhead system at 1200 volts DC. It is operated by the Ferrovie Luganesi company.

The FLP opened in 1912 and is the last working line of an interconnected network including two other suburban lines, the Lugano–Tesserete railway and the Lugano–Cadro–Dino railway, and the urban tramways of Lugano. There are proposals to extend the line back into some of the areas formerly covered by this network.

The FLP is a member of the Arcobaleno tariff network and passenger services are designated S60. Trains run every 15 minutes on weekdays and every 30 minutes on weekends.

== History ==
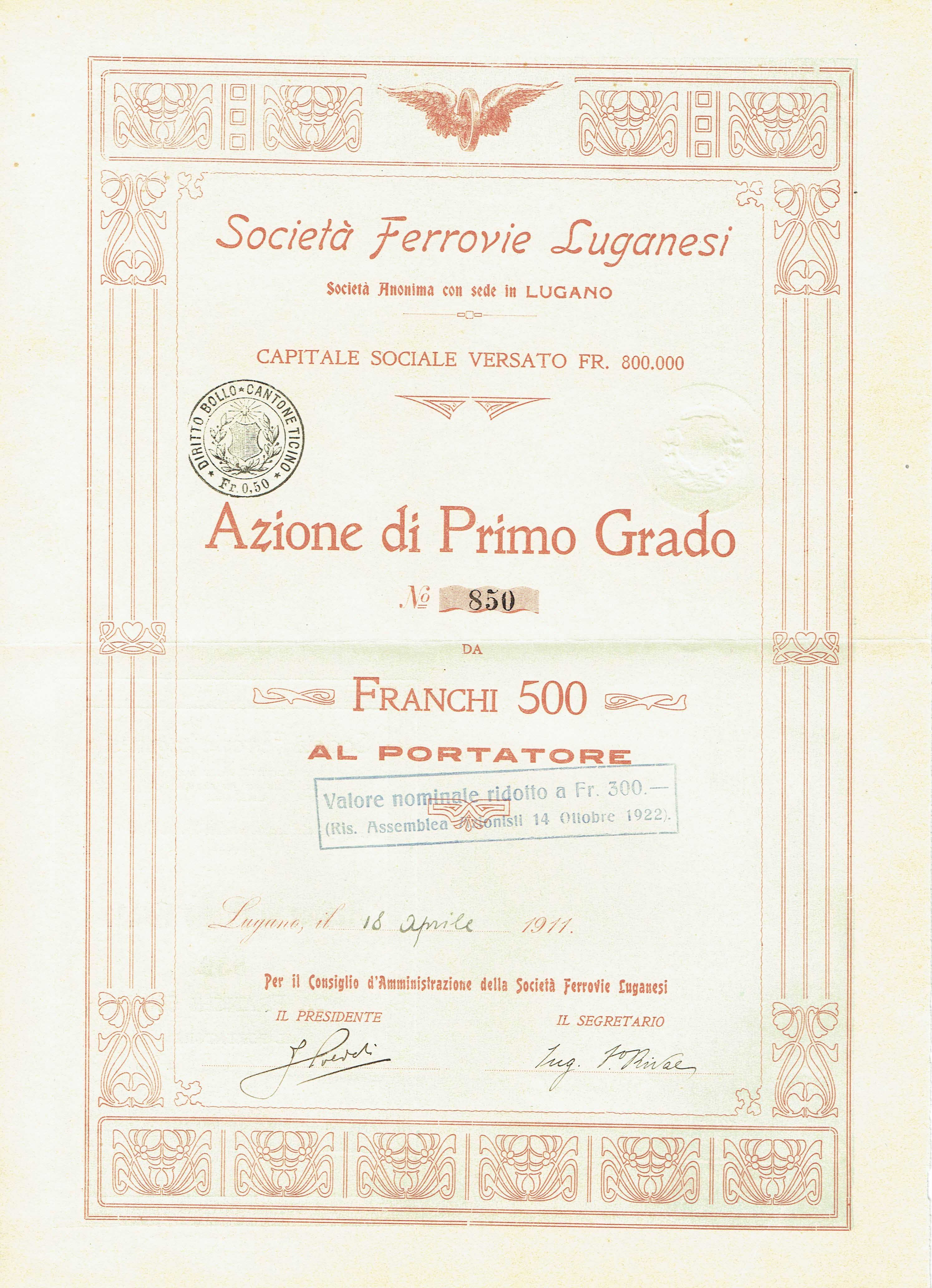
Share of the Società Ferrovie Luganesi, issued 18. April 1911

The first proposal for a railway between Lugano and Ponte Tresa dates back to 1877, when a standard gauge line was proposed with the expectation it would be extended to Varese in Italy. However nothing was done until 1910, when the Ferrovie Luganesi company was founded to construct a narrow gauge electric railway between the two towns.

The line opened in 1912, and had a rolling stock comprising three motor cars, three passenger trailers and six freight cars. At Lugano station, a link track connected to the adjacent Lugano–Tesserete railway, allowing transfer of rolling stock.

In 1949 and 1964, new routings were introduced in Ponte Tresa and east of Bioggio respectively. In 1968, three new articulated electric trains were introduced, but these were transferred to the Società Subalpina Imprese Ferroviarie in 1978, when they were replaced by five new twin-car trains. In the same year a regular interval timetable, with trains every 20 minutes, was introduced. In 1979, Magliaso station was rebuilt in collaboration with the PTT.

Between 1990 and 1992, Agno station and Lugano FLP station were both renovated and expanded. In 2001, a new Bioggio Molinazzo station was constructed. In 2002, five new low floor centre carriages were acquired, and used to expand the 1978 twin-car units into three car units.

Between 2004 and 2007, significant upgrading work was undertaken in order to allow the introduction of 15 minute interval service. This included the doubling of the track in the Magliaso and Bioggio areas, and expanding Magliaso station and Cappella-Agnuzzo station.

== Operation ==
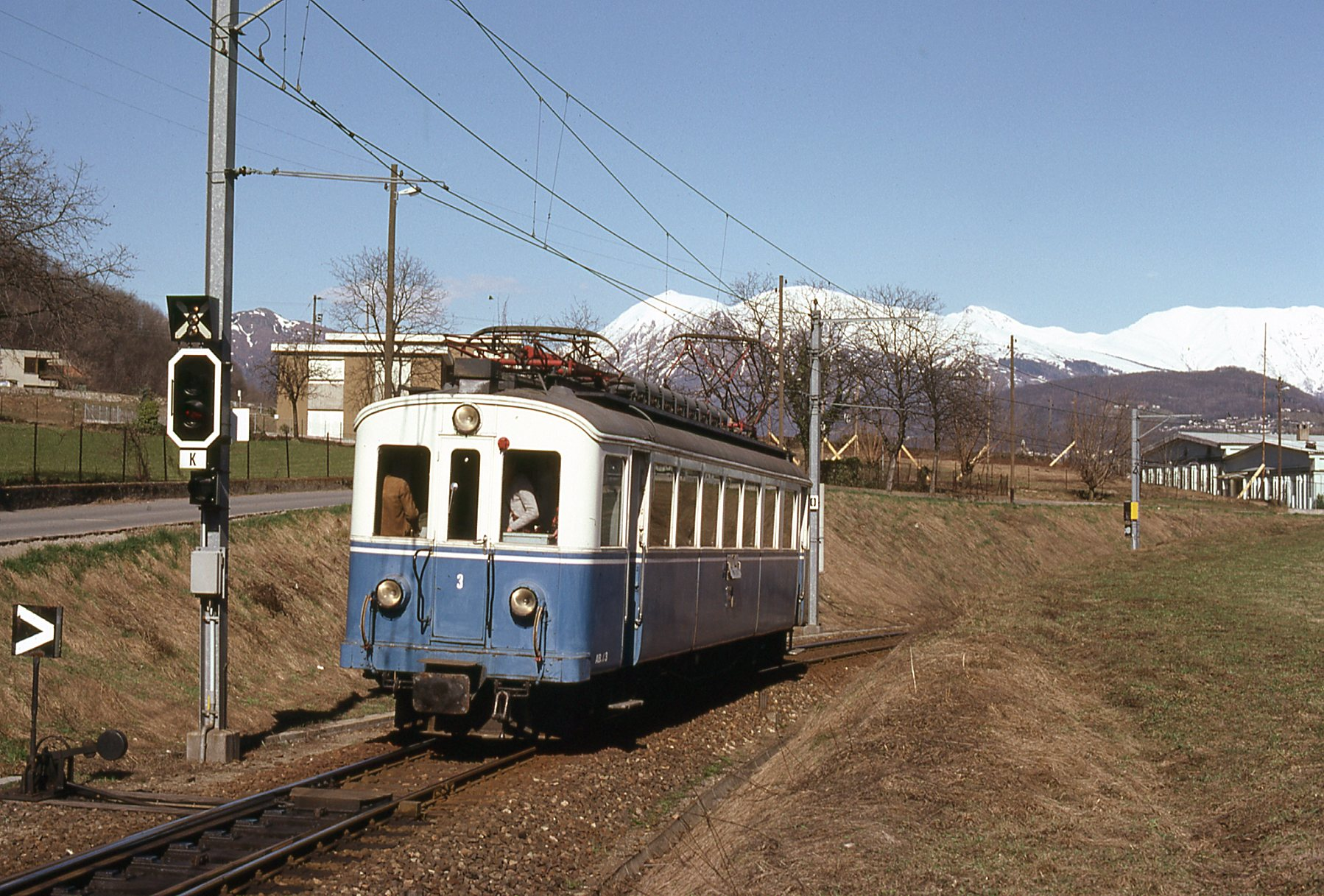
One of the three original motor cars, still in service in 1978.

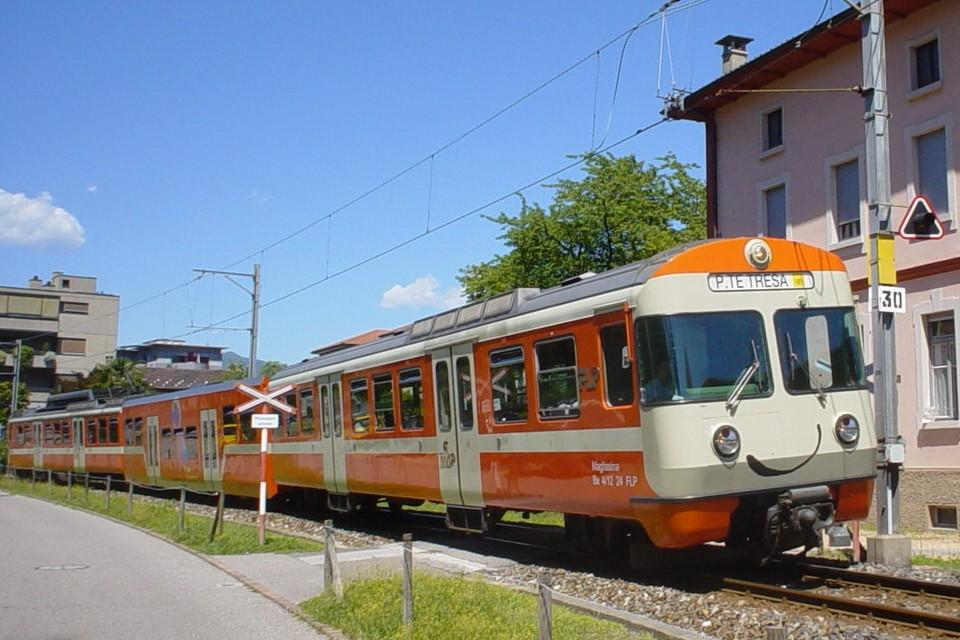
One of the Be 4/12 sets with low-floor centre car. Note the 'smile'.

The line is 12.3 kilometres (7.6 mi) long and links Lugano station, also served by the Gotthard line, and Ponte Tresa station. Trains run every 15 minutes on weekdays and every 30 minutes on weekends, with a running time of 25 minutes. In normal service, trains pass in the stations of Cappella-Agnuzzo, Serocca and Magliaso. Other stations served are Sorengo, Sorengo Laghetto, Bioggio Molinazzo, Bioggio, Agno, Magliaso Paese and Caslano.

Most services are provided by five Be 4/12 sets, numbered 21-25 and made up of the 1978-built twin-car sets strengthened with a 2002-built low-floor intermediate car. The line also possesses two 1979-built Be 4/8 twin-car sets, number 41-42 and purchased second hand from Ferrovie Autolinee Regionali Ticinesi, which are kept in reserve. A Tm 2/2 diesel locomotive is used for works duties. Cars are painted in an orange and cream colour scheme, with a distinctive stylised smile on the front.

The line is built to metre gauge (3 ft 3 3/8 in gauge), and is electrified on the overhead system at 1200 volts DC. The workshops are adjacent to Agno station, but trains are stabled at both termini. There is also a permanent way siding at Bioggio Molinazzo station.
