= Lugano FLP railway station =

Swiss railway station

Lugano FLP
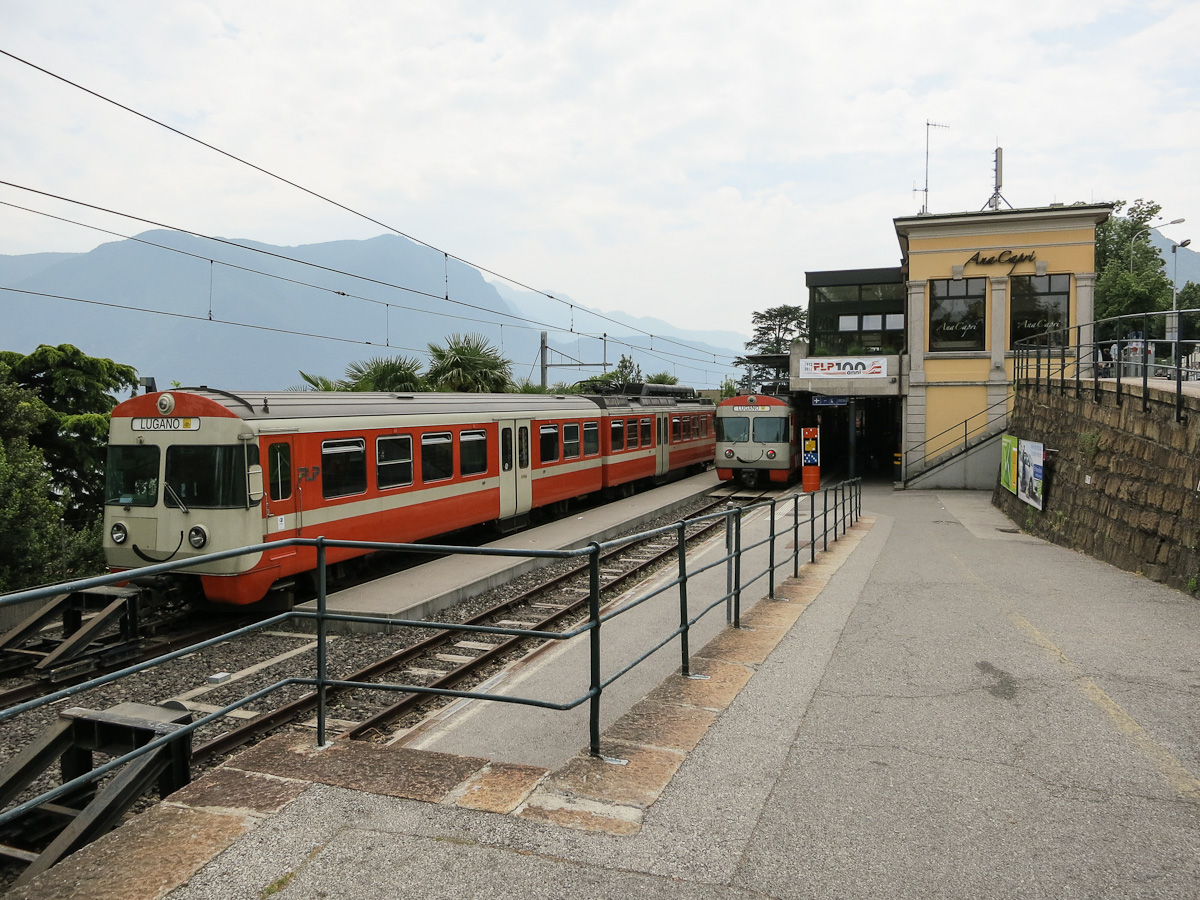
- The station in 2012

General information
- Location: Lugano; Switzerland
- Coordinates: 46°00′16″N 8°56′51″E
- Owner: Ferrovie Luganesi
- Line: Lugano–Ponte Tresa line
- Train operators: Ferrovie Luganesi

History
- Opened: 1912

Services
Preceding station	Ferrovie Luganesi	Following station
Sorengo towards Ponte Tresa	S60	Terminus
Location
- Location within Switzerland Location within Canton of Ticino

Lugano FLP railway station (Italian: Stazione di Lugano FLP) is a railway station in the municipality of Lugano, in the Swiss canton of Ticino. It is the eastern terminus of the 1,000 mm (3 ft 3 3/8 in) gauge Lugano–Ponte Tresa line of Ferrovie Luganesi. The station is located in the forecourt of Swiss Federal Railways' main-line Lugano railway station.

The station and line opened in 1912. Between 1990 and 1992 the Lugano FLP station was renovated and expanded. The street level building is now a restaurant, although the platforms remain in use at the lower level.

== Services ==
As of the December 2021 timetable change, the following services stop at Lugano FLP:

- S60: service every fifteen minutes to Ponte Tresa on weekdays and half-hourly on weekends.
