= Ponte Tresa railway station =

Railway station in Switzerland

Ponte Tresa
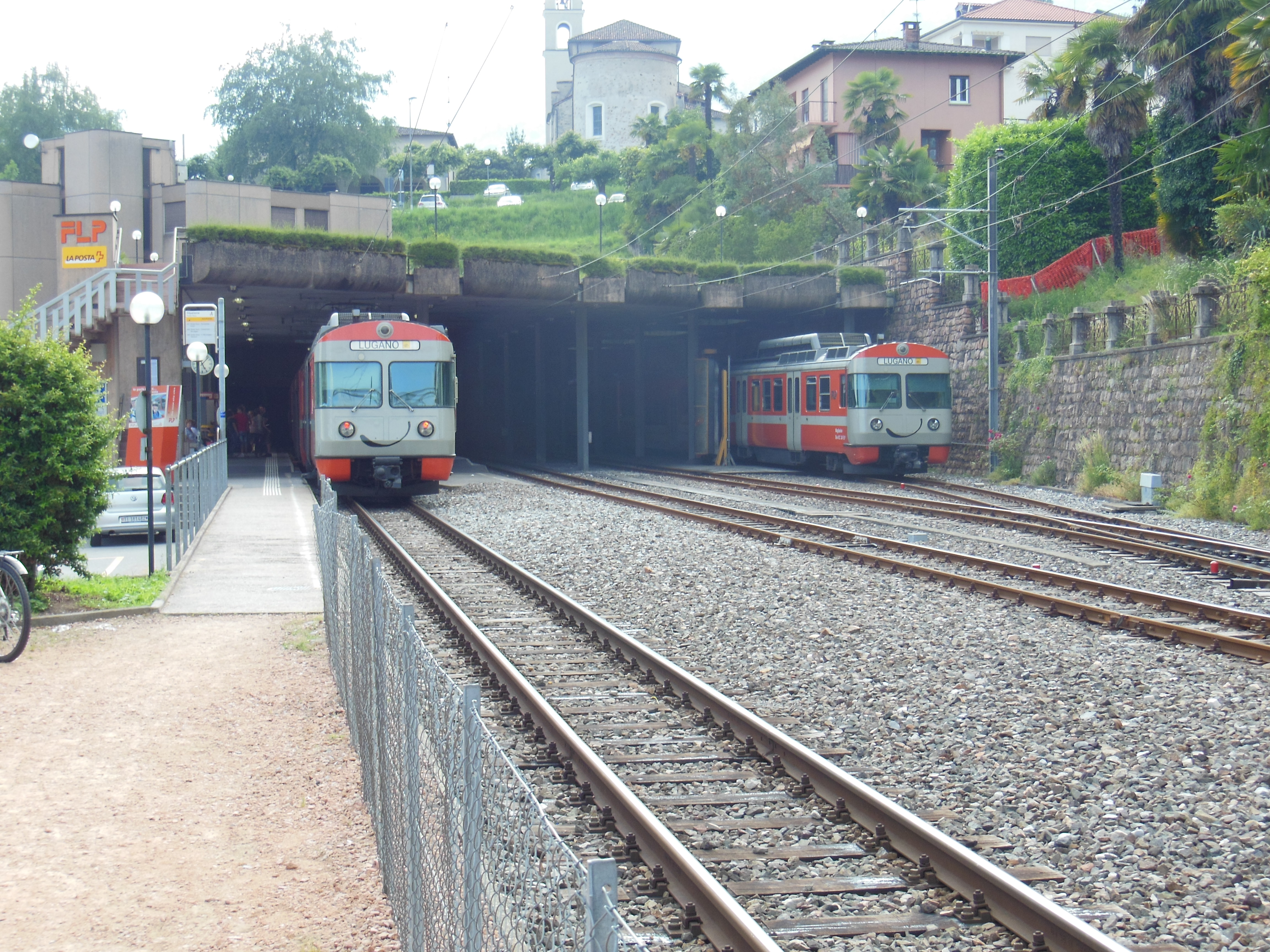
- The station in 2012

General information
- Location: Ponte Tresa; Switzerland
- Coordinates: 45°58′12″N 8°51′38″E
- Elevation: 276 m (906 ft) AMSL
- Owner: Ferrovie Luganesi
- Line: Lugano–Ponte Tresa line
- Distance: 12.3 km (7.6 mi) from Lugano FLP
- Platforms: 2
- Train operators: Ferrovie Luganesi
- Connections: Autopostale bus services; SNL boat services (5 minute walk)

Services
Preceding station	Ferrovie Luganesi	Following station
Terminus	S60	Caslano towards Lugano FLP
Location
- Location within Switzerland Location within Canton of Ticino

Ponte Tresa railway station is a railway station in the municipality of Ponte Tresa in the Swiss canton of Ticino. The station is the terminus of the metre gauge Lugano–Ponte Tresa railway (FLP), from Lugano.

The station has two platform tracks, plus two additional sidings, under a concrete roof with car parking above.

== Services ==
As of the December 2021 timetable change, the following services stop at Ponte Tresa:

- S60: service every fifteen minutes to Lugano FLP on weekdays and half-hourly on weekends.

Autopostale buses connect the station to Luino, Monteggio and Novaggio. In summer the Società Navigazione del Lago di Lugano (SNL) operates a boat service to and from Lugano from a landing stage five minutes walk from the station.

== Gallery ==
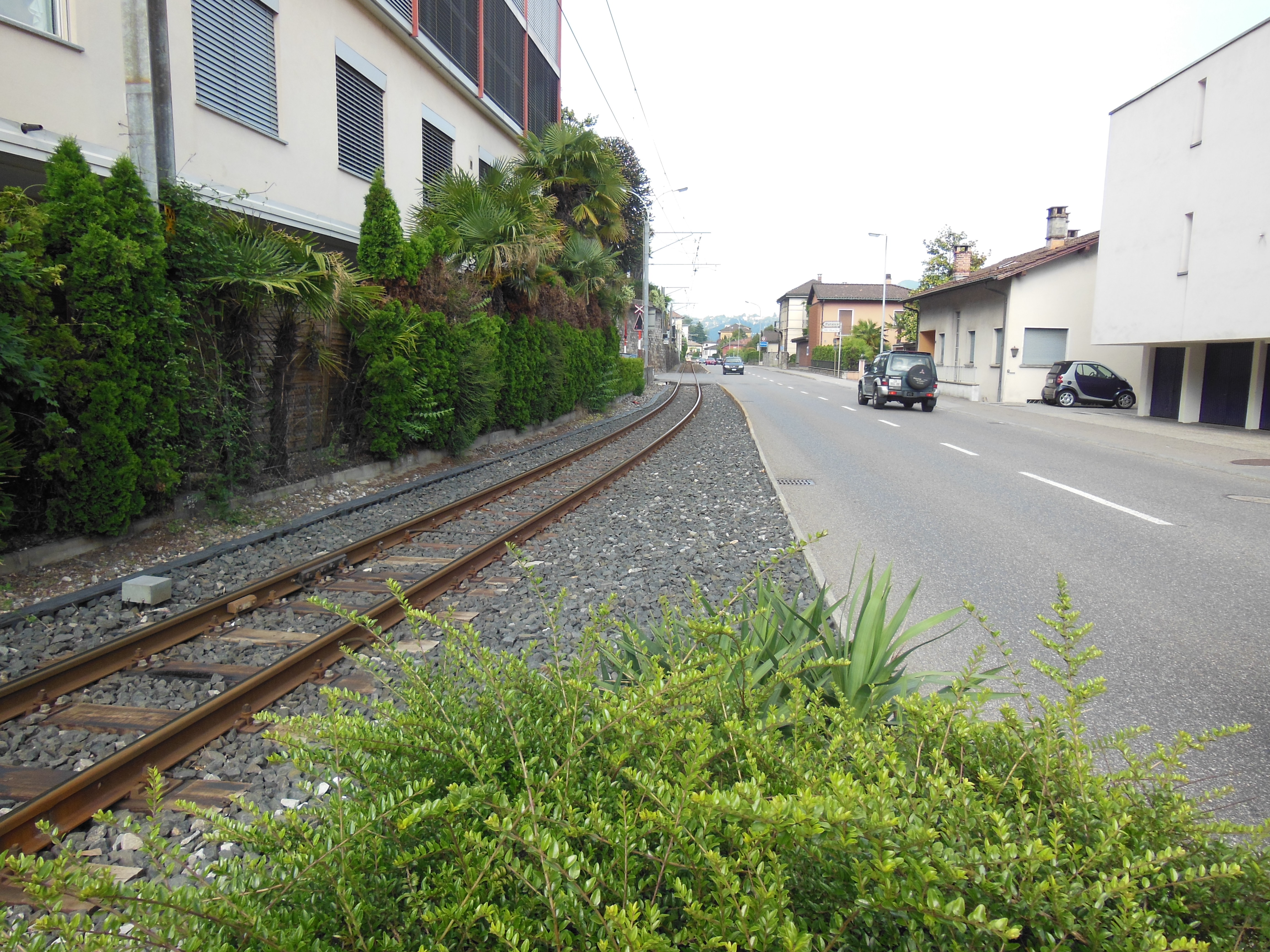
Roadside track approaching the station

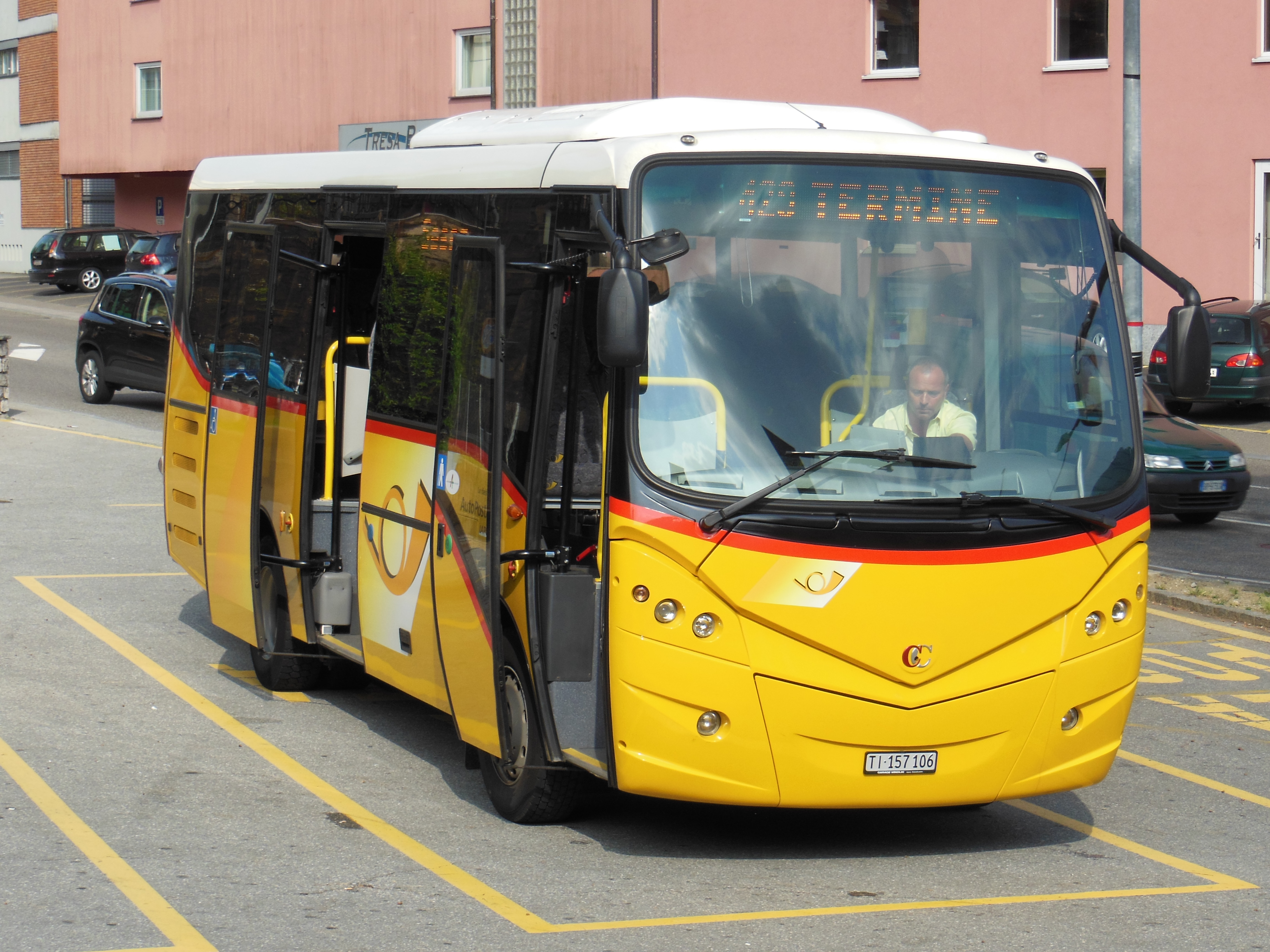
Autopostale bus at the station
