= Ponte Tresa =

- Former municipality
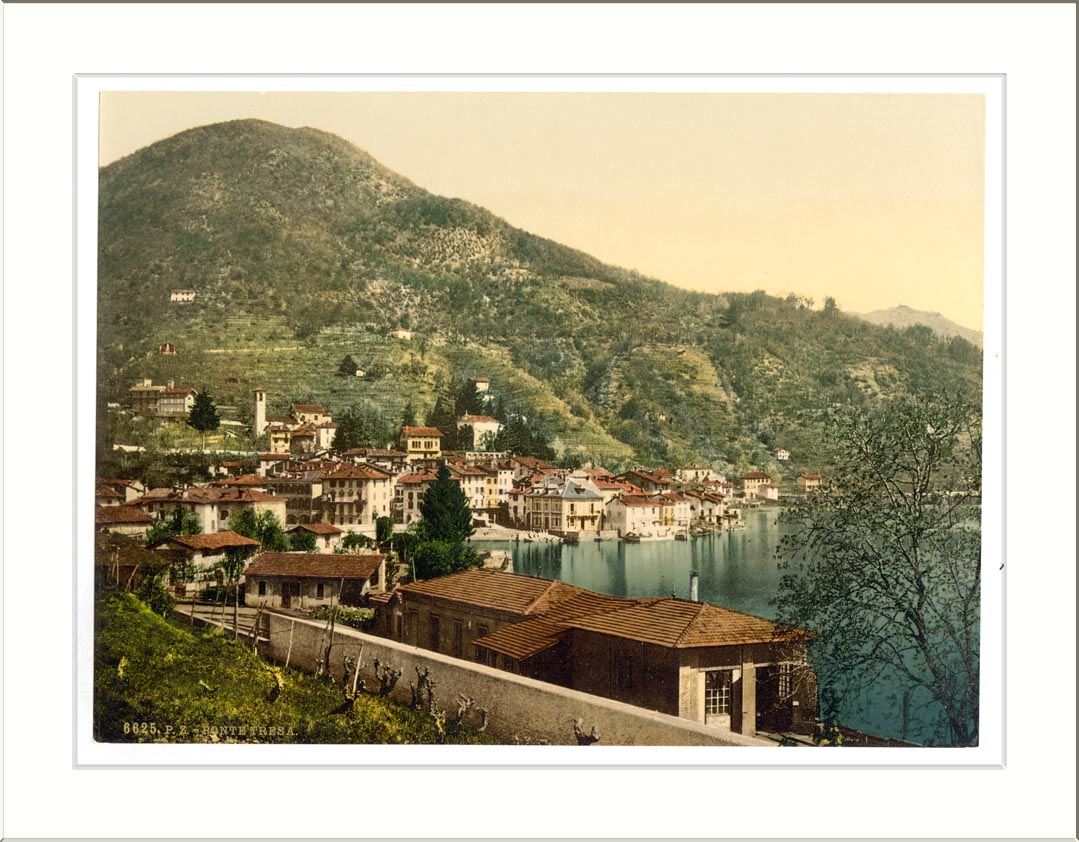
- Ponte Tresa village

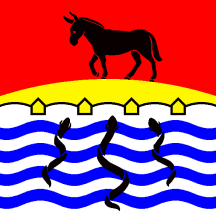
- Flag Coat of arms
- Location of Ponte Tresa
- Location within Switzerland Location within Canton of Ticino
- Coordinates: 45°58′N 8°52′E
- Country: Switzerland
- Canton: Ticino
- District: Lugano

Government
  - Mayor: Sindaco

Area
  - Total: 0.41 km^{2} (0.16 sq mi)
- Elevation: 277 m (909 ft)

Population (December 2019)
  - Total: 773
  - Density: 1,900/km^{2} (4,900/sq mi)
- Time zone: UTC+01:00 (CET)
  - Summer (DST): UTC+02:00 (CEST)
- Postal code: 6988
- SFOS number: 5213
- ISO 3166 code: CH-TI
- Surrounded by: Caslano, Croglio, Lavena, Lavena Ponte Tresa (Italy)
- Website: www.pontetresa.ch

Ponte Tresa (Ticinese: Pont da Tresa) is a former municipality in the district of Lugano in the canton of Ticino in Switzerland. On 18 April 2021 the municipalities of Croglio, Monteggio, Ponte Tresa and Sessa merged to form Tresa.

== History ==
Ponte Tresa is first mentioned in 818 as ad Tresiae Pontem, though this comes from a 12th-century copy of the earlier document. In 875 it was mentioned as Ponte Tretia. In German it was known as Treisbruck, though this name is no longer used.

Aerial view by Walter Mittelholzer (1919)

The history of the town is closely tied to the Tresa river crossing, which was first mentioned in 590 by Gregory of Tours. The name of the municipality, and the neighboring, Italian town of Lavena Ponte Tresa, both come from the river. From the Middle Ages until the opening of the Melide causeway in 1847, the municipality provided strategically important connections to Italy. Even in the Roman era there was probably a bridge or a ford across the river near the modern village. During the Middle Ages and into the early modern era, the bridge was a wooden bridge with stone pillars. Below the bridge there were fish ponds, which were mostly stocked with eels that belonged to the Bishop of Milan. In the 16th century the bridge was in the possession of local noble families. Until 1828, it remained the property of the de Stoppani family, and then it was purchased by the Canton. The Canton built a new stone bridge in 1846. The current bridge dates from 1962.

At Rocchetta, in the area above the town, lie the ruins of the Comacine masters castle of S. Martino, which was destroyed in the war between Como and Milan (1118–27). During the Middle Ages, Ponte Tresa enjoyed certain responsibilities and privileges in connection with border control, tolls and upkeep on the bridge. The Duke of Milan granted the village a tax exemption, which was confirmed by the Swiss Confederation in the 15th century.

The village church belong to the parish of Lavena Ponte Tresa until 1821 when it became an independent parish. The church of S. Bernardino dates from the 15th century, and was renovated in 1972–82.

The railway Lugano-Ponte Tresa was inaugurated in 1912.

== Geography ==
Lake Lugano near Ponte Tresa

Ponte Tresa had an area, as of 1997, of 0.41 square kilometers (0.16 sq mi). Of this area, 0.14 km^{2} (0.054 sq mi) or 34.1% is used for agricultural purposes, while 0.18 km^{2} (0.069 sq mi) or 43.9% is forested. Of the rest of the land, 0.19 km^{2} (0.073 sq mi) or 46.3% is settled (buildings or roads), 0.03 km^{2} (7.4 acres) or 7.3% is either rivers or lakes.

Of the built up area, housing and buildings made up 31.7% and transportation infrastructure made up 9.8%. while parks, green belts and sports fields made up 4.9%. Out of the forested land, all of the forested land area is covered with heavy forests. Of the agricultural land, 2.4% is used for growing crops and 31.7% is used for alpine pastures. All the water in the municipality is flowing water.

The former municipality is located in the Lugano district, on Lake Lugano along the Swiss-Italian border, about 12 km (7.5 mi) from Lugano. The neighboring Italian town is called Lavena Ponte Tresa.

== Coat of arms ==
The blazon of the municipal coat of arms is Per fess gules and argent, four barrulets azure; resting upon the line of partition a five-arched bridge or, ensigned of a mule sable; swimming in the waters in base three eels sable.

== Demographics ==
Ponte Tresa had a population (as of 2019) of 773. As of 2008, 27.3% of the population are resident foreign nationals. Over the last 10 years (1997–2007) the population has changed at a rate of 3.5%.

Most of the population (as of 2000) speaks Italian (79.8%), with German being second most common (13.3%) and French being third (2.6%). Of the Swiss national languages (as of 2000), 102 speak German, 20 people speak French, 614 people speak Italian, and 4 people speak Romansh. The remainder (29 people) speak another language.

As of 2008, the gender distribution of the population was 45.6% male and 54.4% female. The population was made up of 251 Swiss men (31.1% of the population), and 117 (14.5%) non-Swiss men. There were 332 Swiss women (41.1%), and 107 (13.3%) non-Swiss women.

In 2008 there were 7 live births to Swiss citizens and 1 birth to non-Swiss citizens, and in same time span there were 9 deaths of Swiss citizens. Ignoring immigration and emigration, the population of Swiss citizens decreased by 2 while the foreign population increased by 1. There was 1 Swiss man and 6 Swiss women who immigrated back to Switzerland. At the same time, there were 11 non-Swiss men and 10 non-Swiss women who immigrated from another country to Switzerland. The total Swiss population change in 2008 (from all sources, including moves across municipal borders) was a decrease of 9 and the non-Swiss population change was an increase of 13 people. This represents a population growth rate of 0.5%.

The age distribution, as of 2009, in Ponte Tresa is; 50 children or 6.2% of the population are between 0 and 9 years old and 76 teenagers or 9.4% are between 10 and 19. Of the adult population, 60 people or 7.4% of the population are between 20 and 29 years old. 108 people or 13.4% are between 30 and 39, 154 people or 19.1% are between 40 and 49, and 99 people or 12.3% are between 50 and 59. The senior population distribution is 106 people or 13.1% of the population are between 60 and 69 years old, 99 people or 12.3% are between 70 and 79, there are 55 people or 6.8% who are over 80.

As of 2000, there were 373 private households in the municipality, and an average of 2. persons per household. In 2000 there were 62 single family homes (or 33.9% of the total) out of a total of 183 inhabited buildings. There were 31 two family buildings (16.9%) and 67 multi-family buildings (36.6%). There were also 23 buildings in the municipality that were multipurpose buildings (used for both housing and commercial or another purpose).

The vacancy rate for the municipality, in 2008, was 0.88%. In 2000 there were 544 apartments in the municipality. The most common apartment size was the 3 room apartment of which there were 173. There were 37 single room apartments and 78 apartments with five or more rooms. Of these apartments, a total of 368 apartments (67.6% of the total) were permanently occupied, while 161 apartments (29.6%) were seasonally occupied and 15 apartments (2.8%) were empty. As of 2007, the construction rate of new housing units was 1.2 new units per 1000 residents.

The historical population is given in the following chart:

== Transport ==
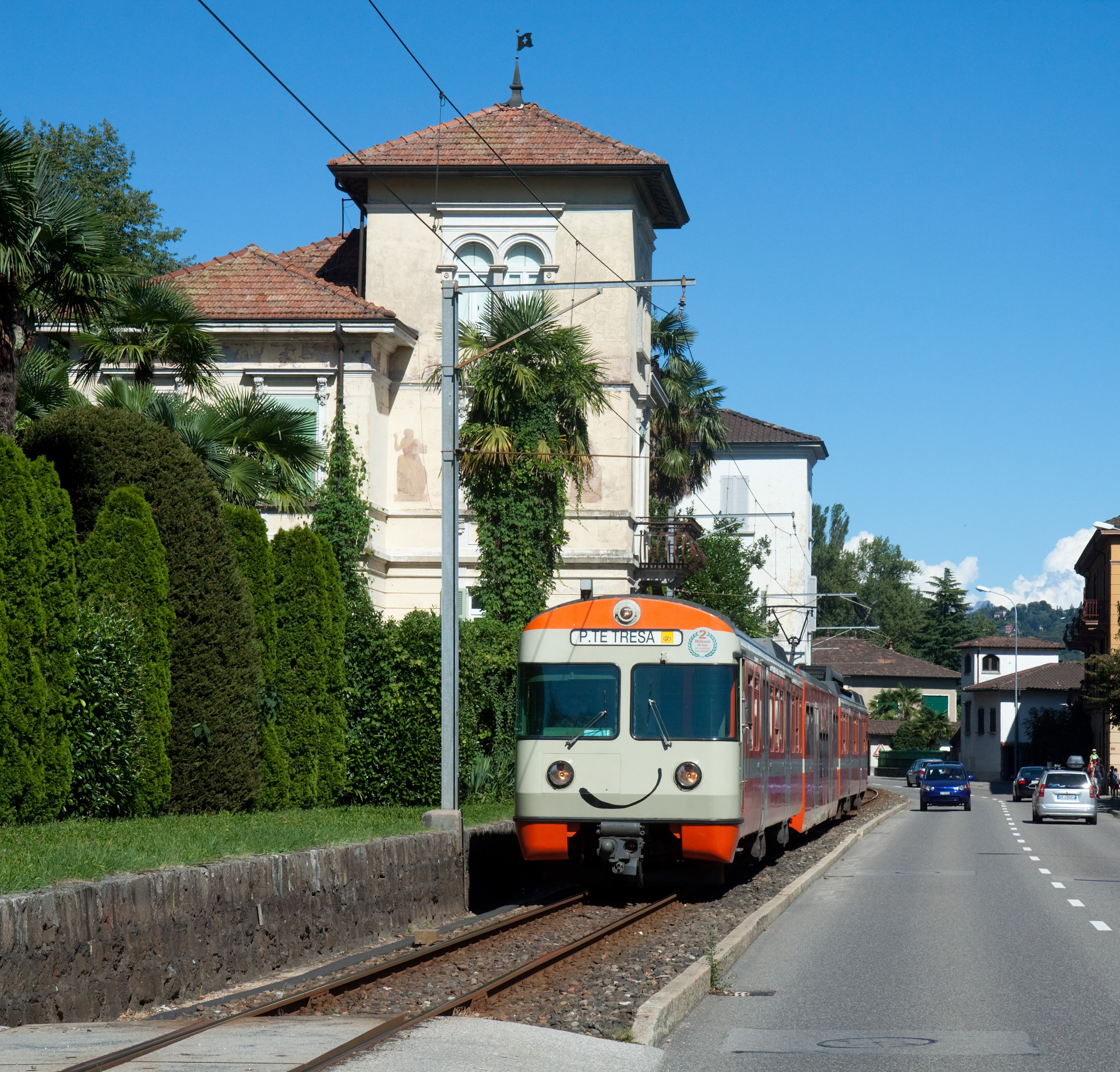
Train of the Lugano-Ponte Tresa Railway arriving in Ponte Tresa

Ponte Tresa is served by Ponte Tresa station on the metre gauge Lugano–Ponte Tresa railway that connects to Lugano. The station is served by regular trains, operating every 15 minutes during weekday daytime, and every half-hour at other times. The railway station is also served by Autopostale buses to Luino, Monteggio and Novaggio.

In summer the Società Navigazione del Lago di Lugano operates a boat service to and from Lugano from a landing stage in the village.

== Politics ==
In the 2007 federal election the most popular party was the FDP which received 43.54% of the vote. The next three most popular parties were the CVP (15.72%), the Ticino League (13.28%) and the SP (11.79%). In the federal election, a total of 217 votes were cast, and the voter turnout was 42.1%.

In the 2007 Gran Consiglio election, there were a total of 524 registered voters in Ponte Tresa, of which 278 or 53.1% voted. 7 blank ballots were cast, leaving 271 valid ballots in the election. The most popular party was the PLRT which received 105 or 38.7% of the vote. The next three most popular parties were; the SSI (with 47 or 17.3%), the LEGA (with 42 or 15.5%) and the PPD+GenGiova (with 28 or 10.3%).

In the 2007 Consiglio di Stato election, 7 blank ballots and 1 null ballot were cast, leaving 270 valid ballots in the election. The most popular party was the PLRT which received 109 or 40.4% of the vote. The next three most popular parties were; the LEGA (with 55 or 20.4%), the SSI (with 41 or 15.2%) and the PPD (with 26 or 9.6%).

== Economy ==
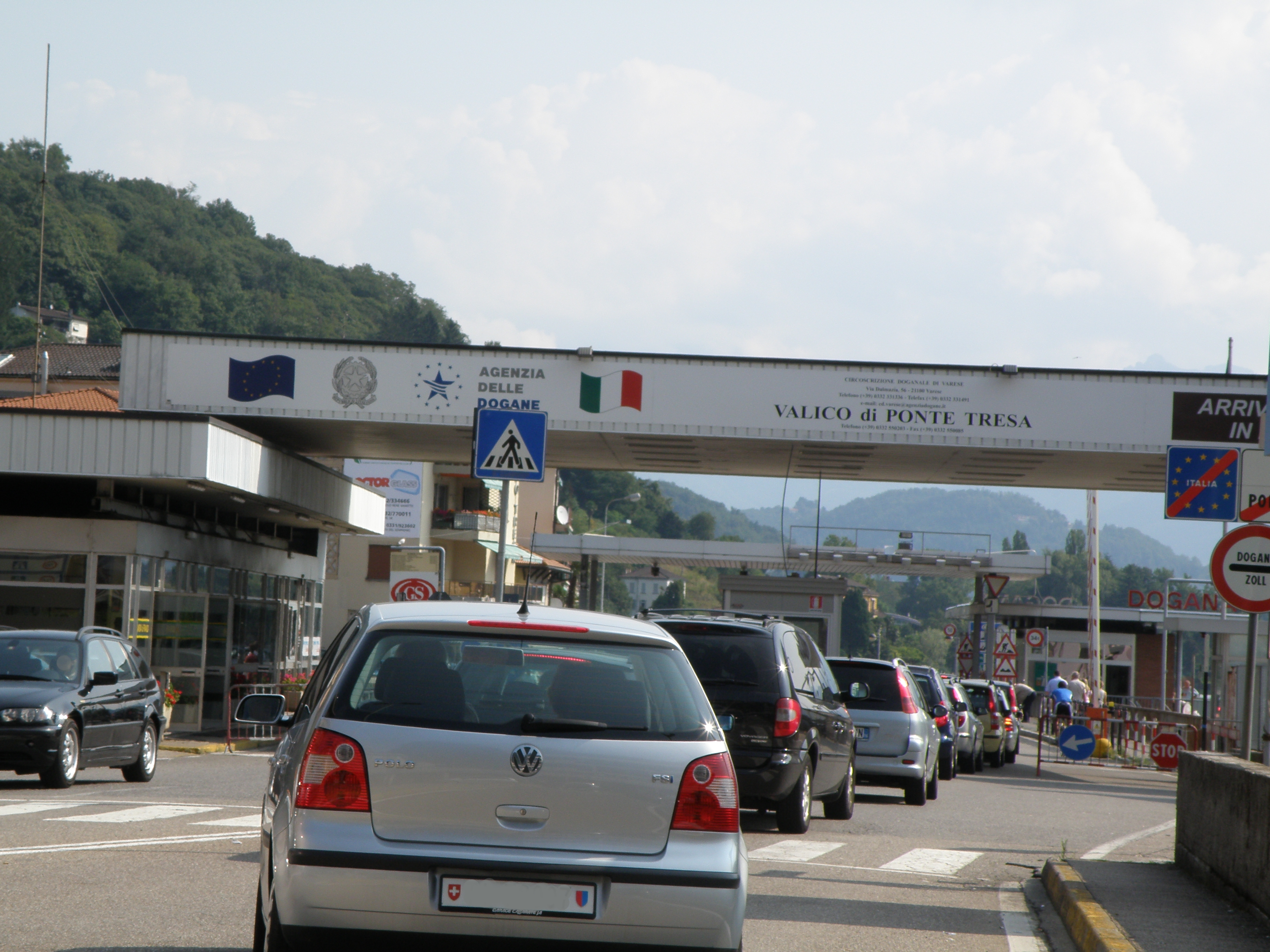
Border crossing at Ponte Tresa, about 20% of the workers in Ponte Tresa cross the border for work

As of 2007, Ponte Tresa had an unemployment rate of 5.4%. As of 2005, there were people employed in the primary economic sector and about businesses involved in this sector. 34 people were employed in the secondary sector and there were 5 businesses in this sector. 235 people were employed in the tertiary sector, with 56 businesses in this sector. There were 332 residents of the municipality who were employed in some capacity, of which females made up 44.3% of the workforce.

In 2000, there were 328 workers who commuted into the municipality and 250 workers who commuted away. The municipality is a net importer of workers, with about 1.3 workers entering the municipality for every one leaving. About 20.1% of the workforce coming into Ponte Tresa are coming from outside Switzerland. Of the working population, 16% used public transportation to get to work, and 55.7% used a private car.

As of 2009, there were 2 hotels in Ponte Tresa.

== Religion ==
From the 2000 census, 605 or 78.7% were Roman Catholic, while 59 or 7.7% belonged to the Swiss Reformed Church. There are 81 individuals (or about 10.53% of the population) who belong to another church (not listed on the census), and 24 individuals (or about 3.12% of the population) did not answer the question.

== Weather ==
Ponte Tresa has an average of 103.8 days of rain or snow per year and on average receives 1,806 mm (71.1 in) of precipitation. The wettest month is May during which time Ponte Tresa receives an average of 226 mm (8.9 in) of rain. During this month there is precipitation for an average of 13.4 days. The driest month of the year is December with an average of 70 mm (2.8 in) of precipitation over 5.8 days.

== Education ==
In Ponte Tresa about 68.7% of the population (between age 25–64) have completed either non-mandatory upper secondary education or additional higher education (either university or a Fachhochschule).

In Ponte Tresa there were a total of 112 students (as of 2009). The Ticino education system provides up to three years of non-mandatory kindergarten and in Ponte Tresa there were 16 children in kindergarten. The primary school program lasts for five years. In the municipality, 23 students attended the standard primary schools. In the lower secondary school system, students either attend a two-year middle school followed by a two-year pre-apprenticeship or they attend a four-year program to prepare for higher education. There were 25 students in the two-year middle school, while 17 students were in the four-year advanced program.

The upper secondary school includes several options, but at the end of the upper secondary program, a student will be prepared to enter a trade or to continue on to a university or college. In Ticino, vocational students may either attend school while working on their internship or apprenticeship (which takes three or four years) or may attend school followed by an internship or apprenticeship (which takes one year as a full-time student or one and a half to two years as a part-time student). There were 11 vocational students who were attending school full-time and 18 who attend part-time.

The professional program lasts three years and prepares a student for a job in engineering, nursing, computer science, business, tourism and similar fields. There were 2 students in the professional program.

As of 2000, there were 4 students in Ponte Tresa who came from another municipality, while 55 residents attended schools outside the municipality.
