= Agra, Switzerland =

Village in Switzerland

Agra
- Former municipality
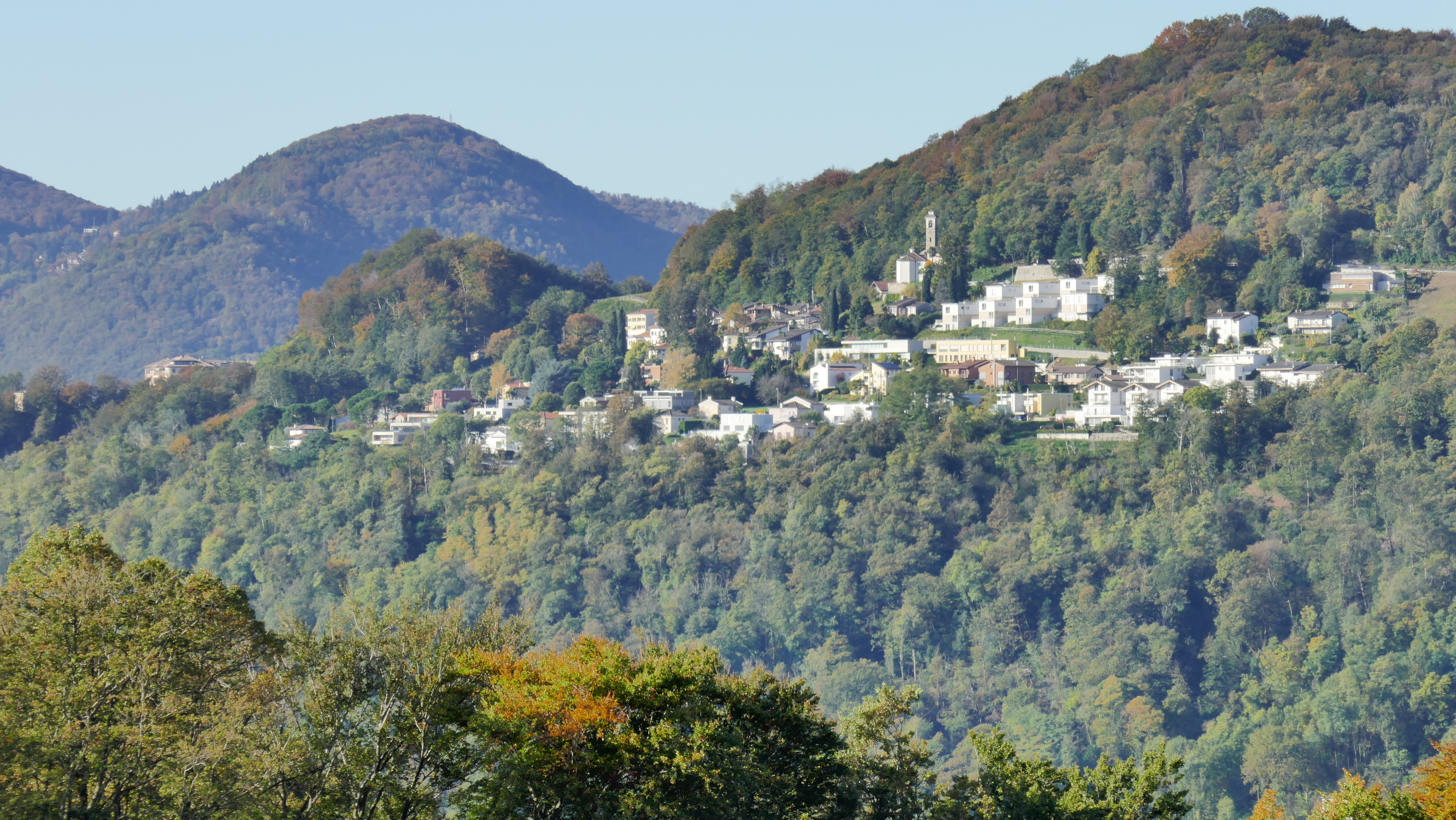

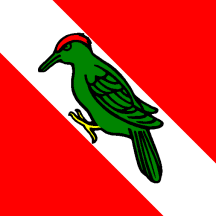
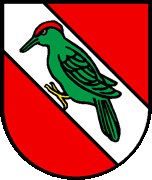
- Flag Coat of arms
- Location of Agra
- Location within Switzerland Location within Canton of Ticino
- Coordinates: 45°58′06″N 8°54′53″E
- Country: Switzerland
- Canton: Ticino
- District: Lugano

Area
  - Total: 1.28 km^{2} (0.49 sq mi)
- Elevation: 552 m (1,811 ft)

Population (December 2003)
  - Total: 434
  - Density: 339/km^{2} (878/sq mi)
- Time zone: UTC+01:00 (CET)
  - Summer (DST): UTC+02:00 (CEST)
- Postal code: 6927
- SFOS number: 5142
- ISO 3166 code: CH-TI
- Surrounded by: Barbengo, Carabietta, Montagnola
- Website: SFSO statistics

Agra is a village and former municipality in the canton of Ticino, Switzerland.

In 2004, the municipality was merged with the other, neighboring municipalities Gentilino and Montagnola to form a new and larger municipality Collina d'Oro.

== History ==
The hamlet of Bigogno, which is part of Agra, is first mentioned in 1270 in an inventory of the lands of the monastery of S. Abbondio in Como in the Valle di Lugano. The inventory of Como Cathedral (1298) mentions their allodial titles and episcopal loans in Agra as well as possessions of the Disentis Abbey. The same document also mentions the church of S. Tommaso in Agra. The church initially belonged to the parish of S. Pietro in Pambio and then became an under-parish in 1591. The Chapel of S. Assunta in Bigogno was completed before 1609. In the statutes of Como from 1335, the Concilium or Vicinanza of Agra and Premona or Barbengo is first mentioned.

In addition to agriculture, the village was once famous for training and sending artisans to Russia along with other European nations. In 1912, a regional sanatorium opened in the village. It was a residence to for many, especially German-speaking, notables and intellectuals. They published the monthly magazine Die Terrasse (The Terrace) from the sanatorium. It was closed in 1969 and fell into disrepair.

== Location ==
Aerial view by Walter Mittelholzer (1919)

The village is located at an elevation of 570 m (1,870 ft) at the foot of Monte Crocione.

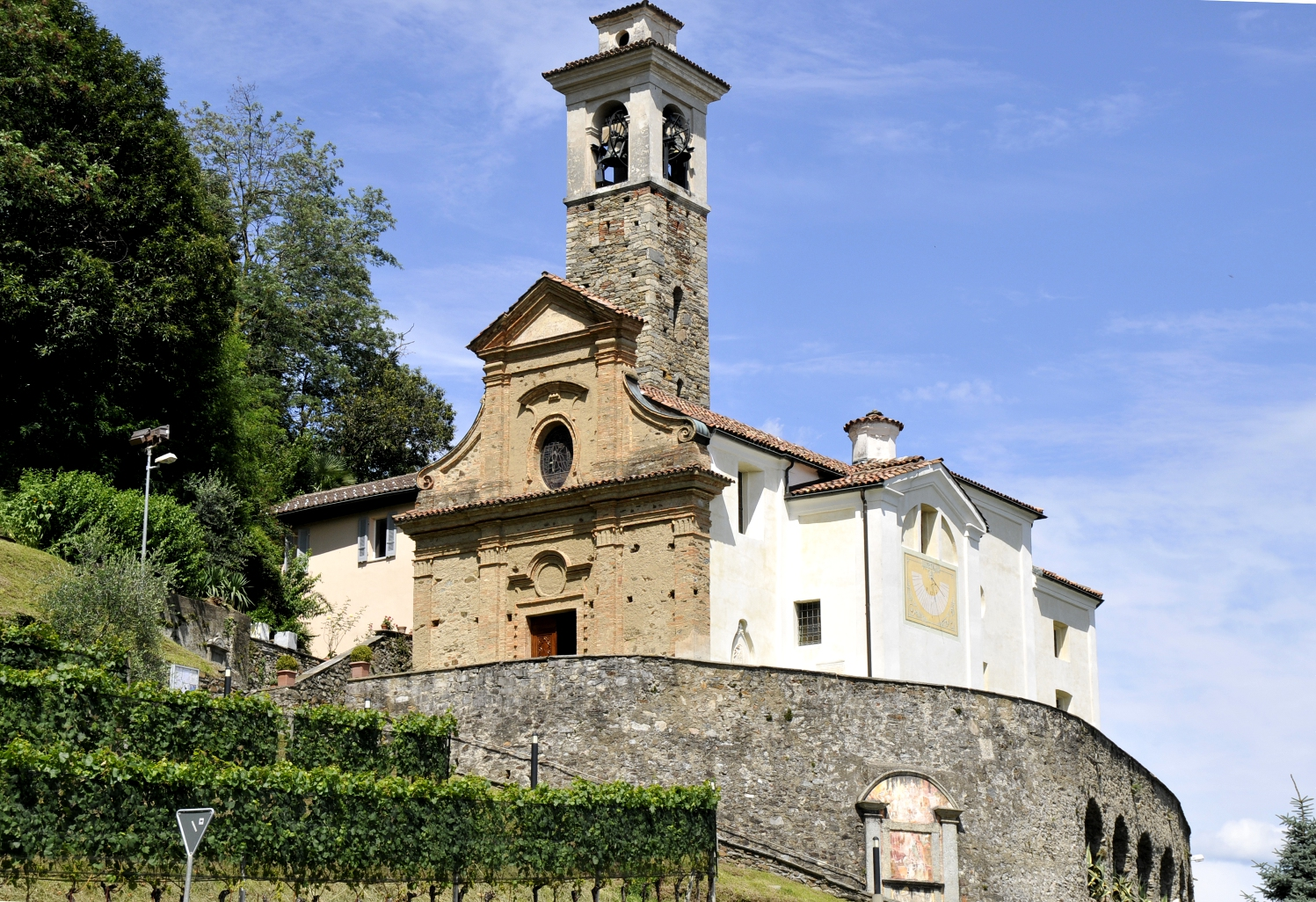
Church of Saint Tommaso

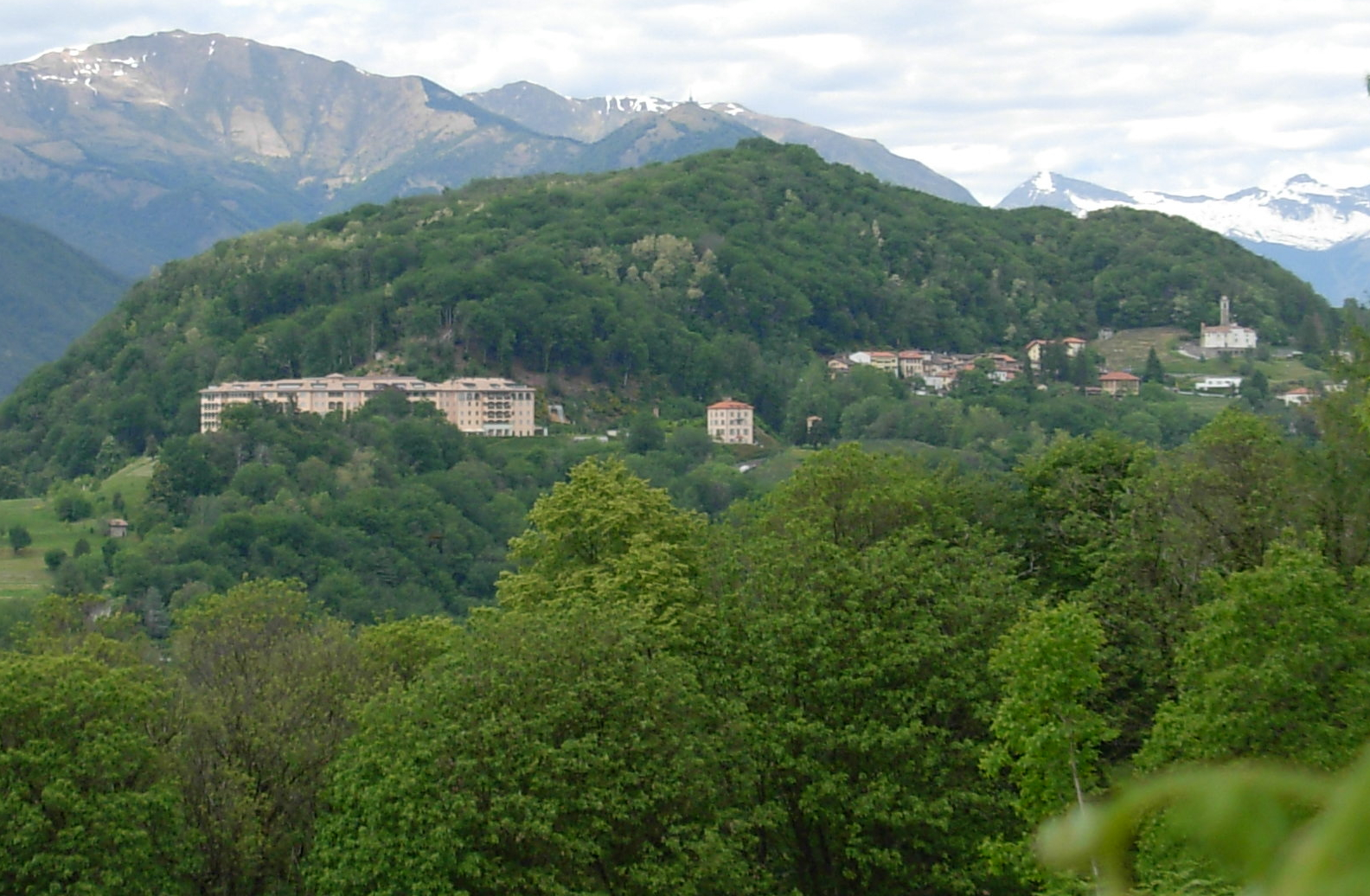
On the right the village Agra

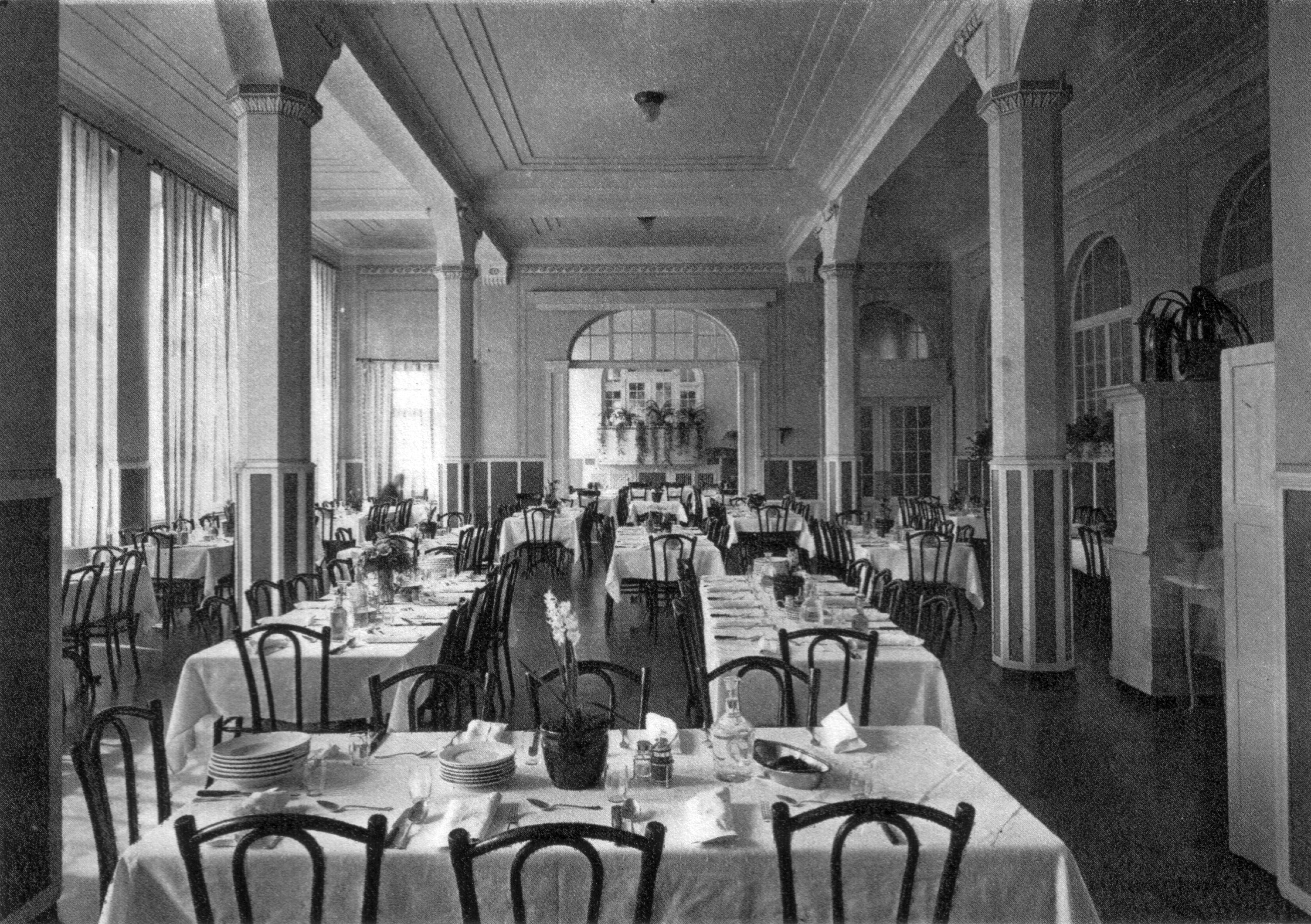
Dining room of the former sanatoriums (1950)

== Historic population ==
The historical population is given in the following chart:
