= Caslano =

- Municipality
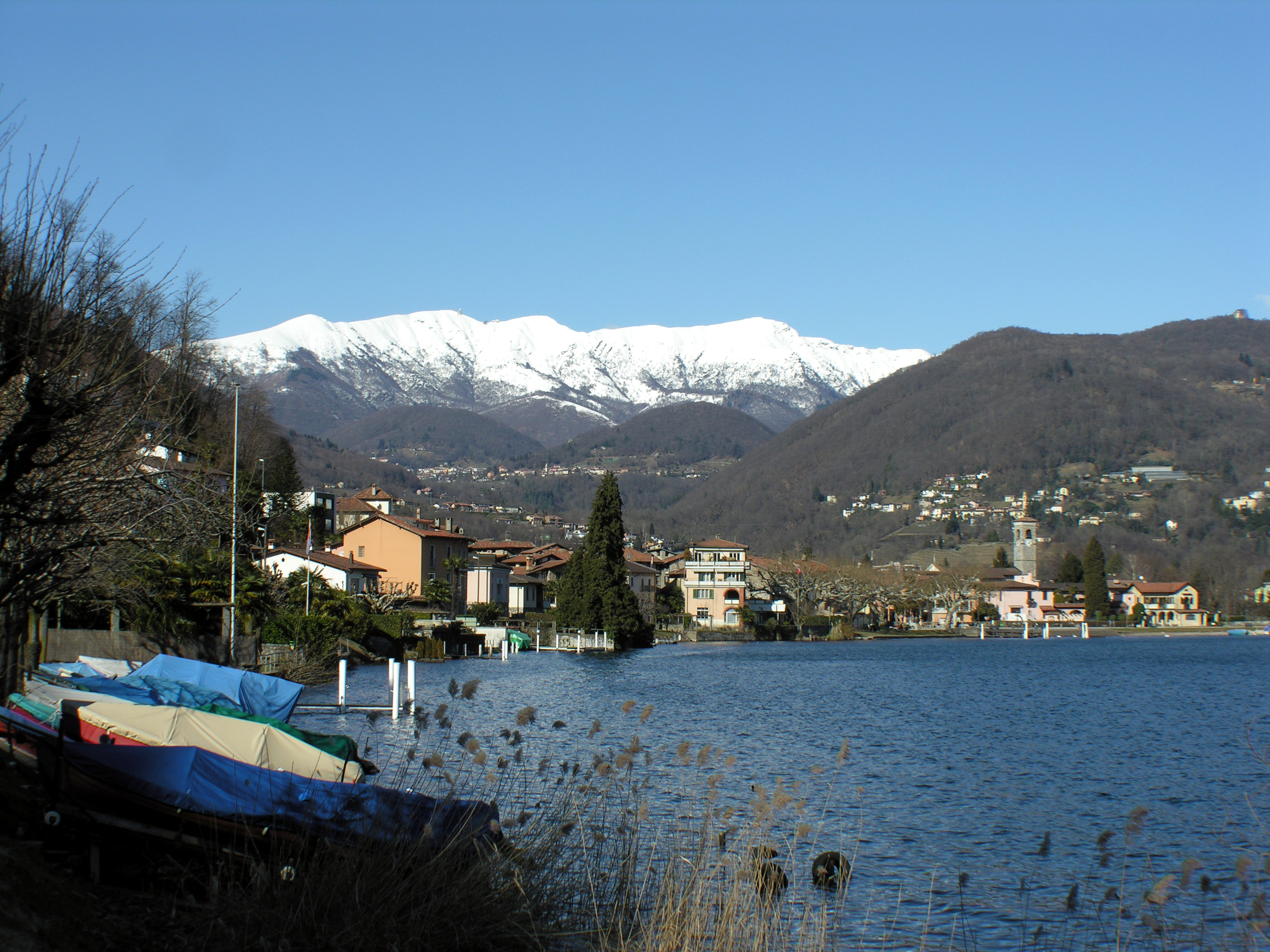
- Caslano village

- Flag Coat of arms
- Location of Caslano
- Location within Switzerland Location within Canton of Ticino
- Coordinates: 45°58′N 8°53′E
- Country: Switzerland
- Canton: Ticino
- District: Lugano

Government
  - Mayor: Sindaco; Emilio Taiana

Area
  - Total: 2.84 km^{2} (1.10 sq mi)
- Elevation: 272 m (892 ft)

Population (December 2004)
  - Total: 3,719
  - Density: 1,310/km^{2} (3,390/sq mi)
- Time zone: UTC+01:00 (CET)
  - Summer (DST): UTC+02:00 (CEST)
- Postal code: 6987
- SFOS number: 5171
- ISO 3166 code: CH-TI
- Surrounded by: Barbengo, Brusimpiano (IT-VA), Carabietta, Lavena Ponte Tresa (IT-VA), Magliaso, Neggio, Ponte Tresa, Pura
- Website: www.caslano.ch

Caslano is a municipality in the district of Lugano in the Swiss canton of Ticino, near to the Italian border.

== History ==
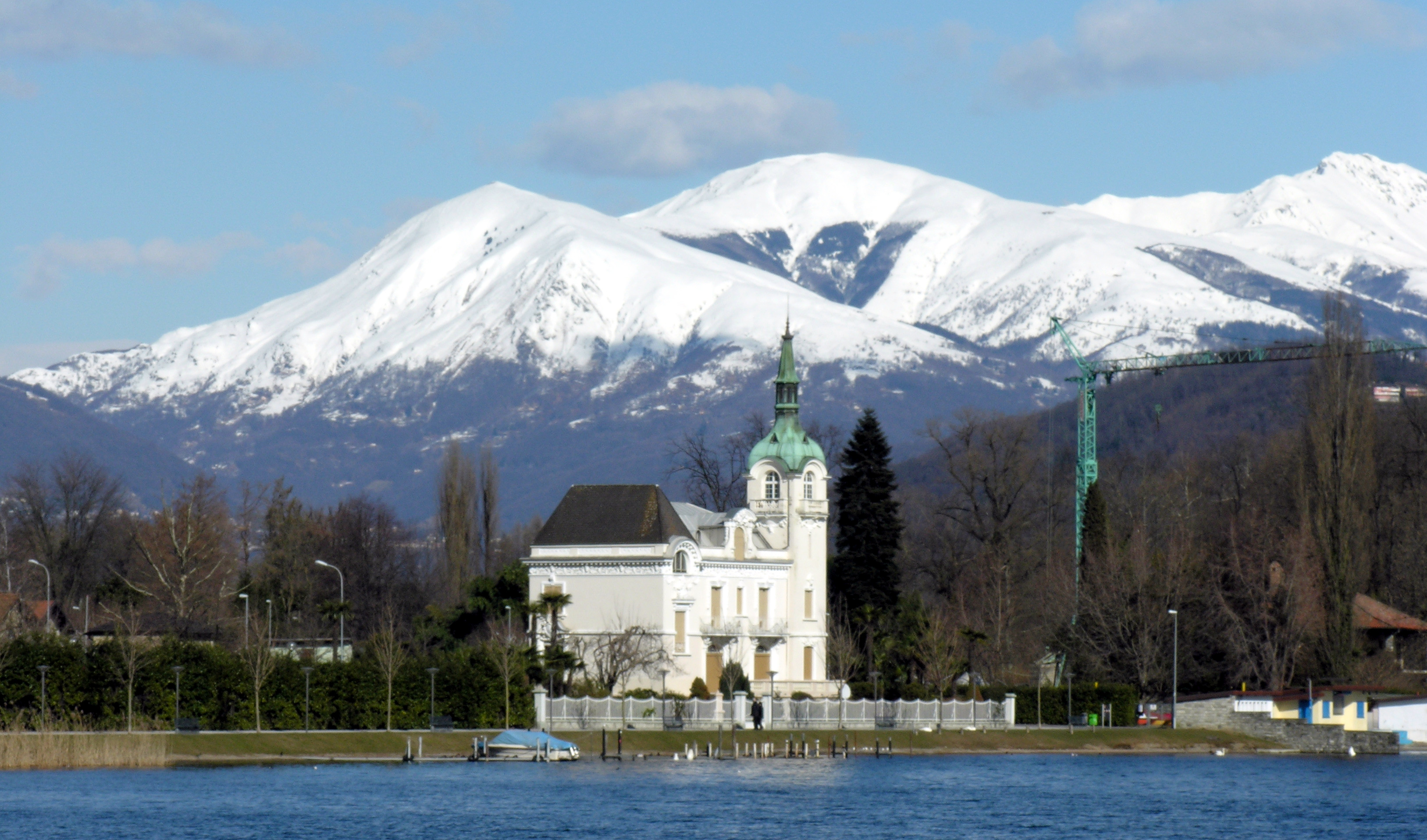
Villa Ferretti in Caslano

The center of the village is built within a Roman era fortification. While no trace of the actual fortification still exists, local tradition, the use of Castellano in place names and the compact structure of the once walled enclosure all indicate that the fortress existed. The hamlet of Torrazza was the source of bitter fighting between the Swiss Confederation and the Duchy of Milan. In 1604, the Treaty of Varese decided against the Italian municipality of Lavena Ponte Tresa and finally awarded it to Caslano.

The parish church was built in 1653, incorporating an older building.

The pre-industrial economy was based on fisheries, mines and kilns for lime and clay, transport by sea, agriculture and by remittances from emigrants. The local wealth is shown in the quality of the buildings in the village and in the neighboring towns of Pura and Collina d'Oro. After World War II, the traditional occupations lost their importance. Agriculture became less common, fisheries disappeared and the mines and furnaces were shut down. Other hand, tourism (hotels, restaurants, vacation homes, second homes), industry, trade and commerce all grew and led to a huge influx of commuters. Construction began throughout the village, and it grew into a tourist destination with a number of suburbs.

== Geography ==
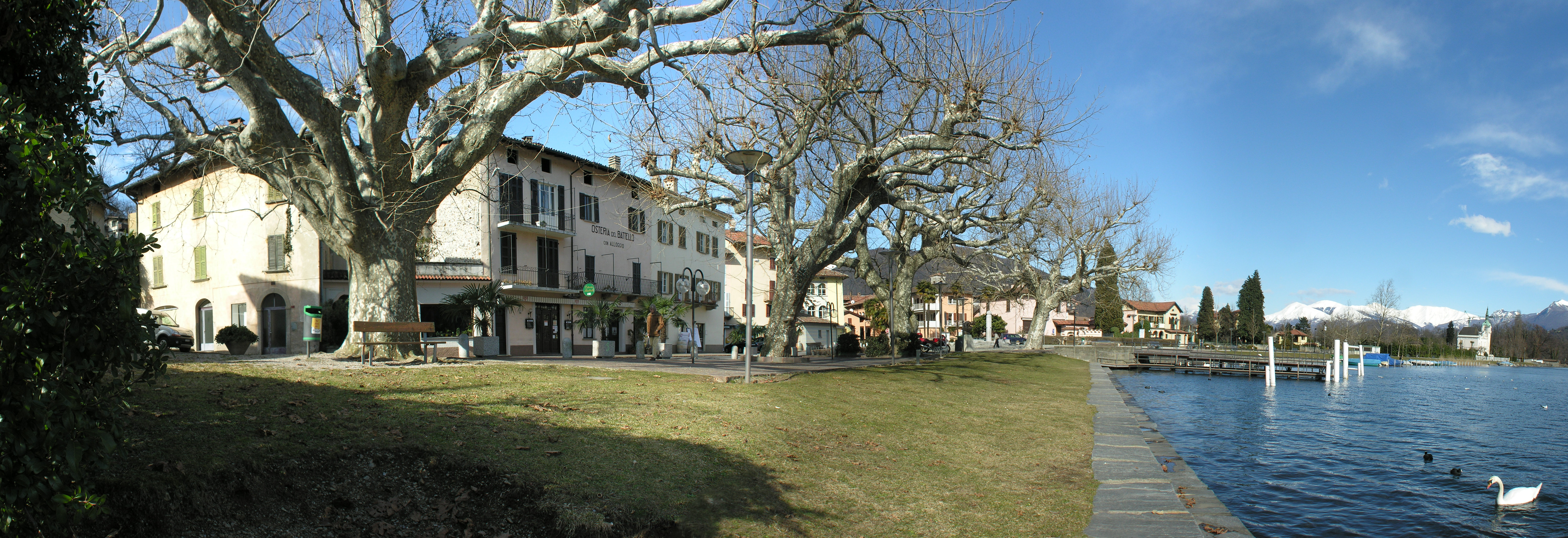
Waterfront of Caslano

Aerial view by Walter Mittelholzer (1919)

Caslano has an area, as of 1997, of 2.84 square kilometers (1.10 sq mi). Of this area, 1.05 km^{2} (0.41 sq mi) or 37.0% is used for agricultural purposes, while 1.1 km^{2} (0.42 sq mi) or 38.7% is forested. Of the rest of the land, 1.36 km^{2} (0.53 sq mi) or 47.9% is settled (buildings or roads), 0.07 km^{2} (17 acres) or 2.5% is either rivers or lakes and 0.03 km^{2} (7.4 acres) or 1.1% is unproductive land.

Of the built up area, industrial buildings made up 3.2% of the total area while housing and buildings made up 29.2% and transportation infrastructure made up 4.9%. while parks, green belts and sports fields made up 10.2%. Out of the forested land, 37.7% of the total land area is heavily forested and 1.1% is covered with orchards or small clusters of trees. Of the agricultural land, 6.3% is used for growing crops, while 1.4% is used for orchards or vine crops and 29.2% is used for alpine pastures. Of the water in the municipality, 1.8% is in lakes and 0.7% is in rivers and streams.

The municipality is located in the Lugano district, along the right bank of the mouth of the Magliasina river in Lake Lugano. It consists of the village of Caslano and the hamlets of Magliasina and Torrazza.

== Coat of arms ==
The blazon of the municipal coat of arms is Gules a castle argent doors and windows sable and fir tree vert both issuant from a mount of the last in turn issuing from a base wavy azure fimbriated of the second.

== Demographics ==
Caslano has a population (as of December 2020) of 4,327. As of 2008, 26.5% of the population are resident foreign nationals. Over the last 10 years (1997–2007) the population has changed at a rate of 13.4%.

Most of the population (as of 2000) speaks Italian (75.7%), with German being second most common (15.6%) and French being third (2.2%). Of the Swiss national languages (as of 2000), 545 speak German, 78 people speak French, 2,646 people speak Italian, and 5 people speak Romansh. The remainder (221 people) speak another language.

As of 2008, the gender distribution of the population was 46.6% male and 53.4% female. The population was made up of 1,299 Swiss men (32.5% of the population), and 562 (14.1%) non-Swiss men. There were 1,627 Swiss women (40.7%), and 508 (12.7%) non-Swiss women.

In 2008 there were 20 live births to Swiss citizens and 11 births to non-Swiss citizens, and in same time span there were 22 deaths of Swiss citizens and 6 non-Swiss citizen deaths. Ignoring immigration and emigration, the population of Swiss citizens decreased by 2 while the foreign population increased by 5. There were 3 Swiss men who emigrated from Switzerland and 5 Swiss women who immigrated back to Switzerland. At the same time, there were 15 non-Swiss men and 15 non-Swiss women who immigrated from another country to Switzerland. The total Swiss population change in 2008 (from all sources, including moves across municipal borders) was an increase of 44 and the non-Swiss population change was an increase of 39 people. This represents a population growth rate of 2.2%.

The age distribution, as of 2009, in Caslano is; 389 children or 9.7% of the population are between 0 and 9 years old and 486 teenagers or 12.2% are between 10 and 19. Of the adult population, 362 people or 9.1% of the population are between 20 and 29 years old. 506 people or 12.7% are between 30 and 39, 657 people or 16.4% are between 40 and 49, and 521 people or 13.0% are between 50 and 59. The senior population distribution is 497 people or 12.4% of the population are between 60 and 69 years old, 381 people or 9.5% are between 70 and 79, there are 197 people or 4.9% who are over 80.

As of 2000, there were 1,497 private households in the municipality, and an average of 2.3 persons per household. In 2000 there were 492 single family homes (or 61.9% of the total) out of a total of 795 inhabited buildings. There were 94 two family buildings (11.8%) and 156 multi-family buildings (19.6%). There were also 53 buildings in the municipality that were multipurpose buildings (used for both housing and commercial or another purpose).

The vacancy rate for the municipality, in 2008, was 0.56%. In 2000 there were 2,170 apartments in the municipality. The most common apartment size was the 4 room apartment of which there were 631. There were 154 single room apartments and 367 apartments with five or more rooms. Of these apartments, a total of 1,491 apartments (68.7% of the total) were permanently occupied, while 581 apartments (26.8%) were seasonally occupied and 98 apartments (4.5%) were empty. As of 2007, the construction rate of new housing units was 2.1 new units per 1000 residents.

The historical population is given in the following chart:

== Sights ==
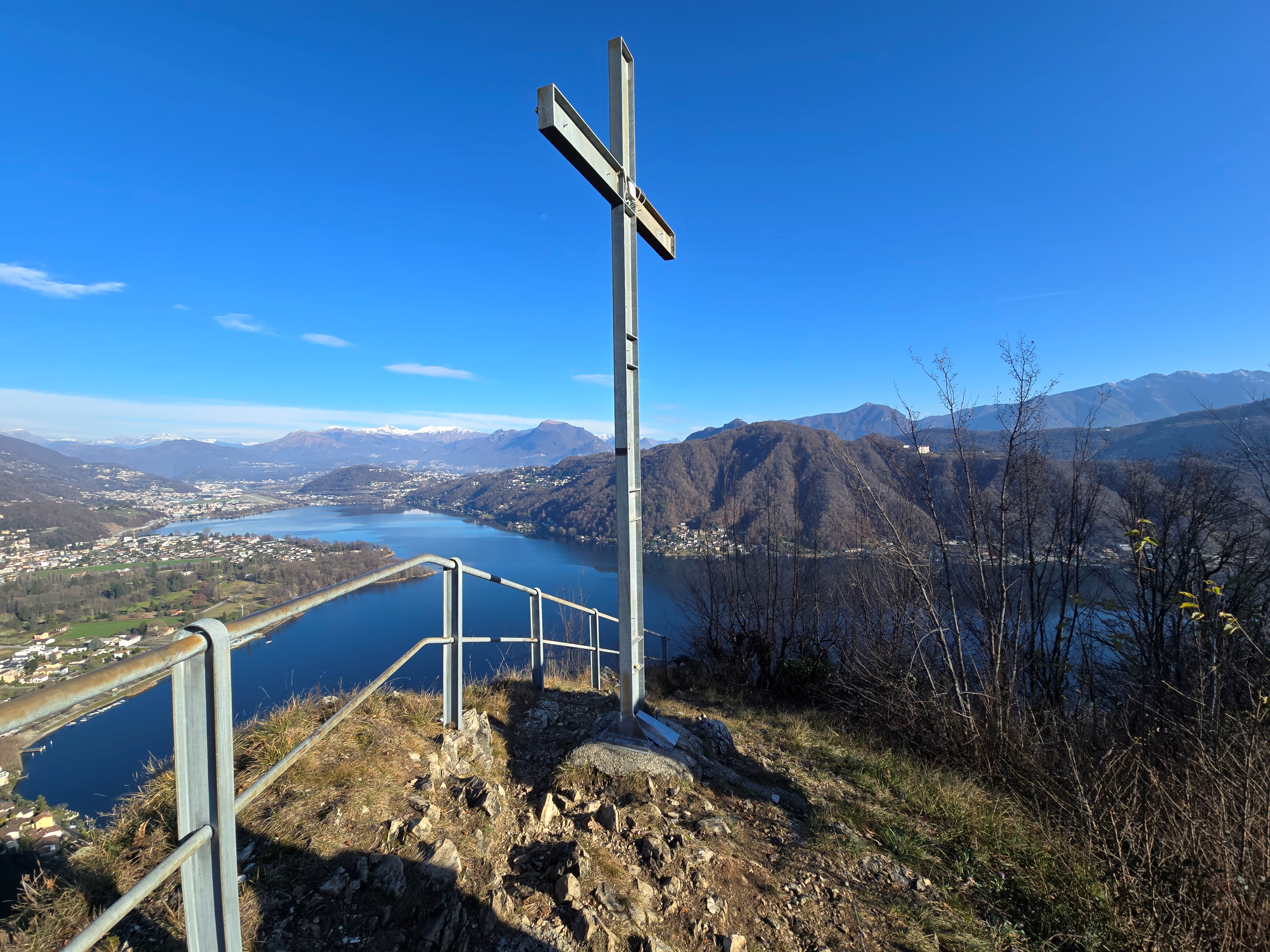
Lake Lugano from Mount Caslano

The entire villaggio of Caslano is designated as part of the Inventory of Swiss Heritage Sites.

== Politics ==
In the 2007 federal election the most popular party was the CVP which received 24.33% of the vote. The next three most popular parties were the FDP (23.16%), the SP (21.9%) and the Ticino League (14.41%). In the federal election, a total of 1,002 votes were cast, and the voter turnout was 43.9%.

In the 2007 Gran Consiglio election, there were a total of 2,286 registered voters in Caslano, of which 1,187 or 51.9% voted. 13 blank ballots and 3 null ballots were cast, leaving 1,171 valid ballots in the election. The most popular party was the PLRT which received 265 or 22.6% of the vote. The next three most popular parties were; the PS (with 230 or 19.6%), the SSI (with 203 or 17.3%) and the PPD+GenGiova (with 193 or 16.5%).

In the 2007 Consiglio di Stato election, 15 blank ballots and 3 null ballots were cast, leaving 1,169 valid ballots in the election. The most popular party was the PLRT which received 246 or 21.0% of the vote. The next three most popular parties were; the PS (with 235 or 20.1%), the LEGA (with 231 or 19.8%) and the PPD (with 188 or 16.1%).

== Economy ==
As of 2007, Caslano had an unemployment rate of 5.39%. As of 2005, there were 15 people employed in the primary economic sector and about 7 businesses involved in this sector. 729 people were employed in the secondary sector and there were 32 businesses in this sector. 479 people were employed in the tertiary sector, with 103 businesses in this sector. There were 1,560 residents of the municipality who were employed in some capacity, of which females made up 43.7% of the workforce.

In 2000, there were 1,497 workers who commuted into the municipality and 1,155 workers who commuted away. The municipality is a net importer of workers, with about 1.3 workers entering the municipality for every one leaving. About 34.3% of the workforce coming into Caslano are coming from outside Switzerland, while 0.5% of the locals commute out of Switzerland for work. Of the working population, 14.6% used public transportation to get to work, and 61.3% used a private car.

As of 2009, there were 3 hotels in Caslano with a total of 40 rooms and 85 beds.

== Religion ==
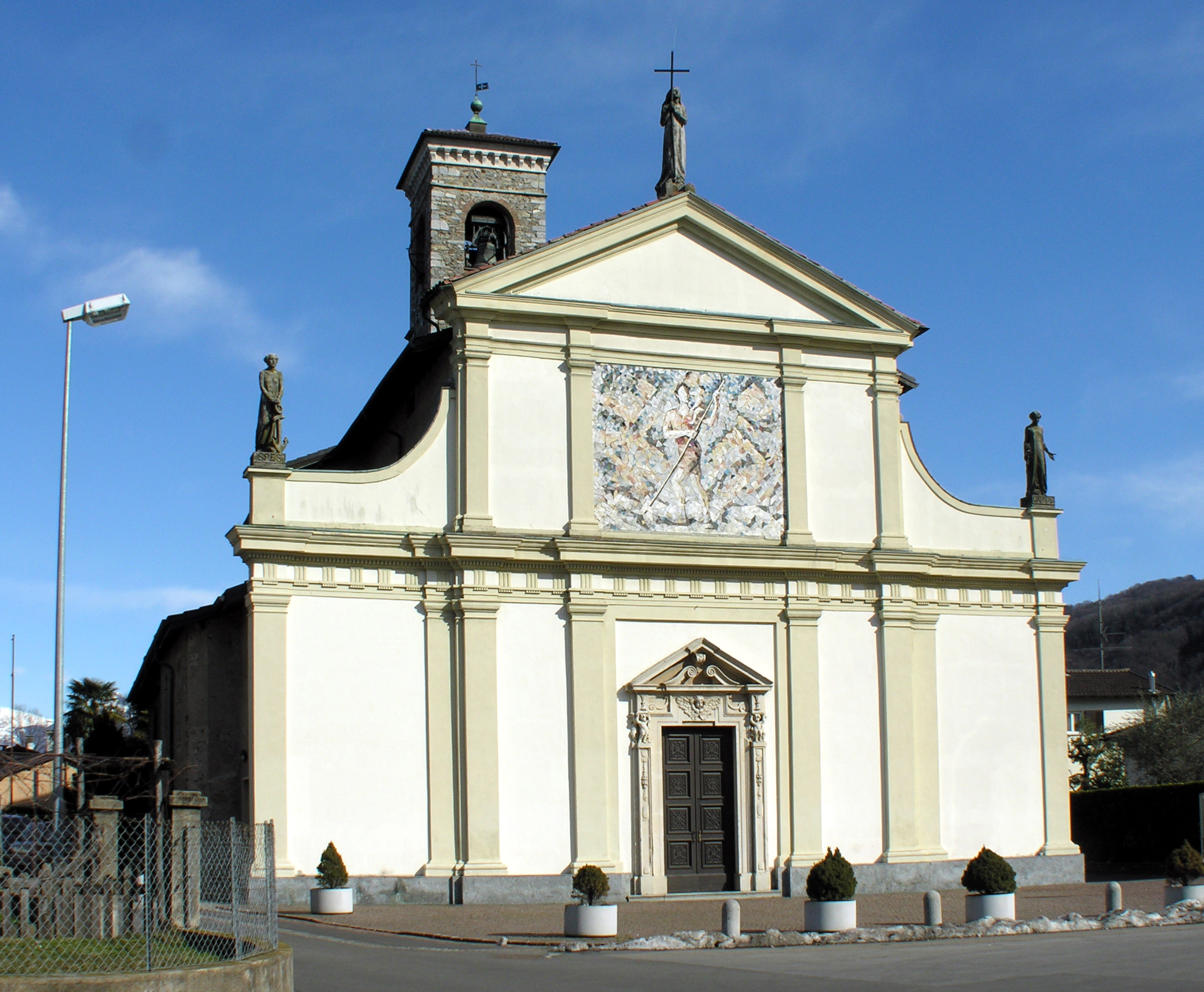
Church of San Cristoforo

From the 2000 census, 2,564 or 73.4% were Roman Catholic, while 404 or 11.6% belonged to the Swiss Reformed Church. There are 431 individuals (or about 12.33% of the population) who belong to another church (not listed on the census), and 96 individuals (or about 2.75% of the population) did not answer the question.

== Education ==
In Caslano about 68.8% of the population (between age 25-64) have completed either non-mandatory upper secondary education or additional higher education (either University or a Fachhochschule).

In Caslano there were a total of 764 students (as of 2009). The Ticino education system provides up to three years of non-mandatory kindergarten and in Caslano there were 110 children in kindergarten. The primary school program lasts for five years and includes both a standard school and a special school. In the municipality, 223 students attended the standard primary schools and 12 students attended the special school. In the lower secondary school system, students either attend a two-year middle school followed by a two-year pre-apprenticeship or they attend a four-year program to prepare for higher education. There were 202 students in the two-year middle school and 5 in their pre-apprenticeship, while 83 students were in the four-year advanced program.

The upper secondary school includes several options, but at the end of the upper secondary program, a student will be prepared to enter a trade or to continue on to a university or college. In Ticino, vocational students may either attend school while working on their internship or apprenticeship (which takes three or four years) or may attend school followed by an internship or apprenticeship (which takes one year as a full-time student or one and a half to two years as a part-time student). There were 49 vocational students who were attending school full-time and 70 who attend part-time.

The professional program lasts three years and prepares a student for a job in engineering, nursing, computer science, business, tourism and similar fields. There were 10 students in the professional program.

As of 2000, there were 6 students in Caslano who came from another municipality, while 345 residents attended schools outside the municipality.

== Transport ==
Caslano is served by Caslano station on the metre gauge Lugano–Ponte Tresa railway that connects to Lugano. The station is located some 1 kilometre (0.62 mi) from the village, and is served by regular trains, operating every 15 minutes during weekday daytime, and every half-hour at other times.

In summer the Società Navigazione del Lago di Lugano operates a boat service between Lugano and Ponte Tresa that calls at a landing stage in the village.
