= Corriere del Ticino =

Regional Swiss newspaper

- Type: Daily newspaper
- Founded: 1891; 135 years ago
- Language: Italian
- Headquarters: Muzzano, Ticino
- Country: Switzerland
- ISSN: 1660-9646
- OCLC number: 31672743
- Website: www.cdt.ch

Corriere del Ticino is a regional daily newspaper in the canton of Ticino, Switzerland.

== History and profile ==
Corriere del Ticino was established in 1891. The paper is published in the Italian language in Muzzano, Ticino.

The paper sold 14,000 copies in 1967. In the early 1990s Corriere del Ticino had a circulation of 36,000 copies. In 1997 the paper had a circulation of 37,742 copies.
