= Gentilino =

Village in Switzerland

- Municipality
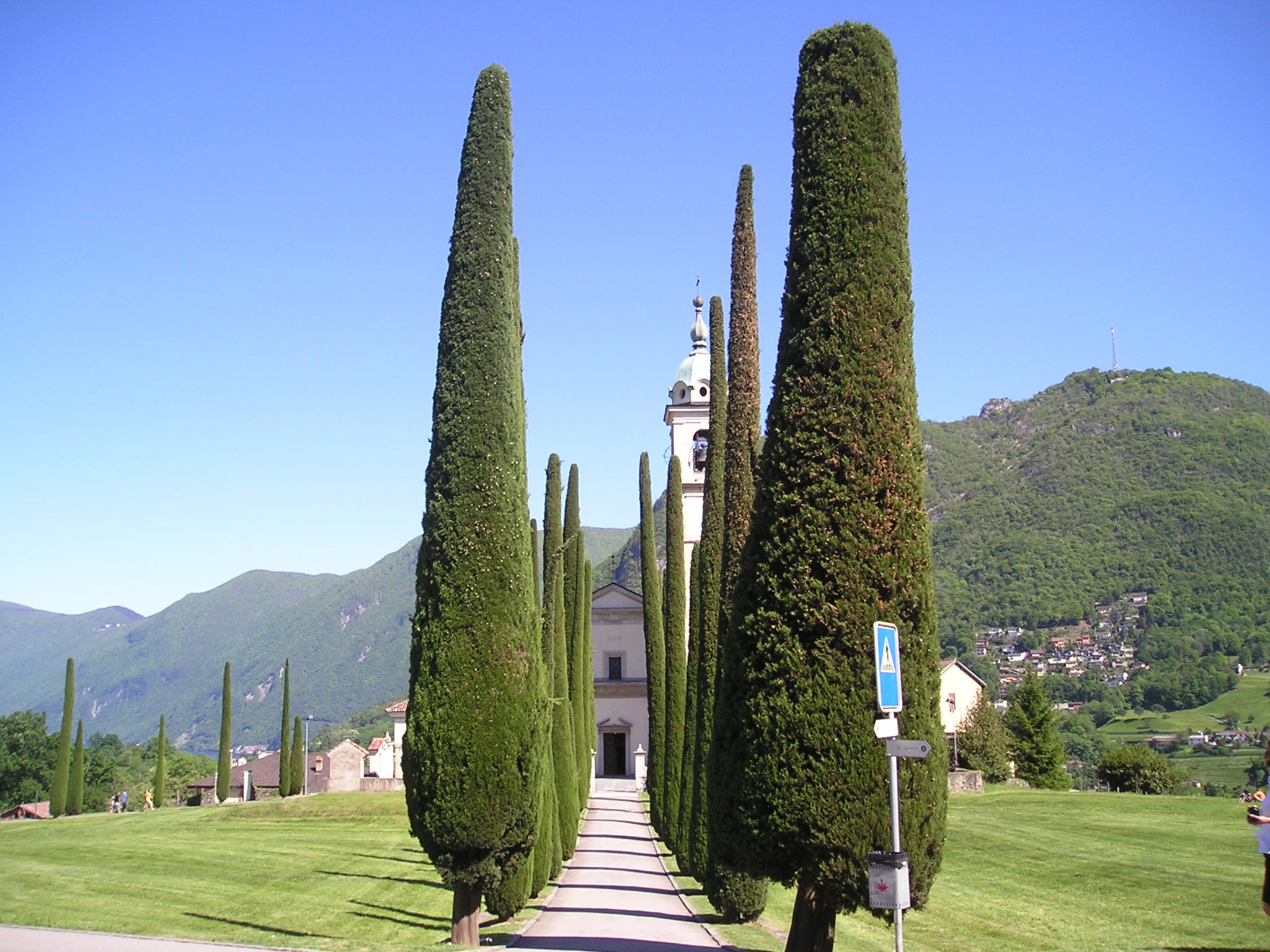
- Church of Sant'Abbondio, in Gentilin

- Flag Coat of arms
- Location of Gentilino
- Location within Switzerland Location within Canton of Ticino
- Coordinates: 45°59′29″N 8°55′56″E
- Country: Switzerland
- Canton: Ticino
- District: Lugano

Area
  - Total: 1.22 km^{2} (0.47 sq mi)
- Elevation: 388 m (1,273 ft)
- Time zone: UTC+01:00 (CET)
  - Summer (DST): UTC+02:00 (CEST)
- Postal code: 6925
- SFOS number: 5185
- ISO 3166 code: CH-TI
- Website: website missing SFSO statistics

Gentilino is a village and former municipality in the canton of Ticino, Switzerland, close to Lake Lugano and the city of Lugano.

The local Church of Sant'Abbondio (in Italian: Chiesa di Sant'Abbondio a Gentilino - not to be confused with the Swiss municipality of Sant'Abbondio above Lake Maggiore, or the Basilica of Sant'Abbondio in Lombardy, Italy) dates from the eleventh century. It is a Swiss heritage site of national significance.

In 2004, the municipality was merged with the other, neighboring municipalities Agra and Montagnola to form a new and larger municipality Collina d'Oro.

== History ==
Gentilino is first mentioned in 1210 as Gentarino.

In the Early Middle Ages, Gentilino belonged to the royal court of Agnuzzo, which was donated in 818 by Emperor Louis the Pious to the clergy of Como. During the 11th century it belonged to the monastery of S. Abbondio in Como. The union of the monastic estates in 1335 probably led to the creation of the Concilium Sancti Abundii which included Gentilino and Viglio as well as Montagnola and the surrounding villages. In the early 18th century, the village wanted to buy the monastery's rights to the village. However, this triggered a long-running dispute, in which the canton was eventually involved.

It is believed that the church of S. Abbondio was the center of a medieval parish, which became a sub-parish in the 11th century. However, the first written record of the church dates from 1140. The current appearance is due to an enlargement in the 17th century.

In the past centuries, the population lived mainly from agriculture, but there was also a large exodus of builders (known as Maestranze). Recently, it has grown into a bedroom community for the nearby city of Lugano.

== Location ==
Until the merger, it included the north side of the Collina d'Oro valley, and the settlement of Viglio.

A pre-primary school is located in Gentilino.

== Historic population ==
The historical population is given in the following chart:
