= Montagnola =

Swiss village in Ticino

- Municipality
- Flag Coat of arms
- Location of Montagnola
- Location within Switzerland Location within Canton of Ticino
- Coordinates: 45°59′00″N 8°55′05″E
- Country: Switzerland
- Canton: Ticino
- District: Lugano

Area
  - Total: 3.24 km^{2} (1.25 sq mi)
- Elevation: 467 m (1,532 ft)
- Time zone: UTC+01:00 (CET)
  - Summer (DST): UTC+02:00 (CEST)
- Postal code: 6926
- SFOS number: 5201
- ISO 3166 code: CH-TI
- Website: website missing SFSO statistics

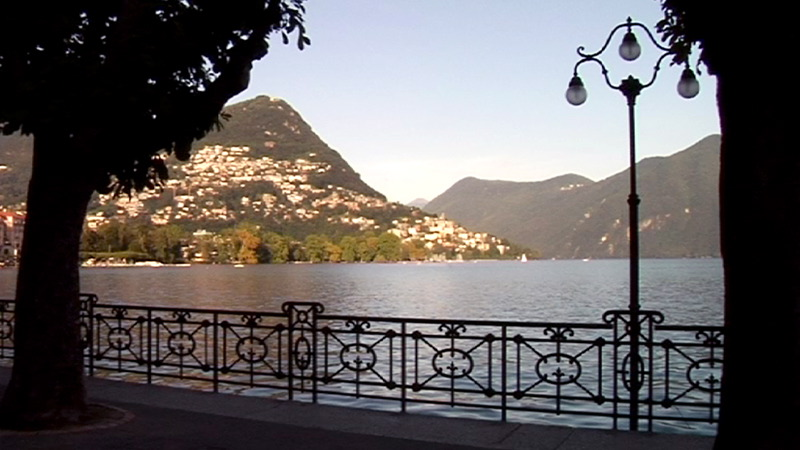
Photo of Lake Lugano near Montagnola

Montagnola (Italian pronunciation: [montaɲˈɲɔːla]) is a small Swiss village in Collina d'Oro municipality. Located in the Italian-speaking canton of Ticino, it is close to the border between Switzerland and Italy. It looks over Lake Lugano and the city of Lugano upon it. It falls within the local parish of Sant'Abbondio Gentilino.

Landmarks include the house where Hermann Hesse lived for half of his life, a house where George Harrison went for health reasons and The American School In Switzerland (TASIS), a boarding school.

Montagnola was formerly a municipality of its own, but was merged with Agra and Gentilino in 2004 to form the new municipality Collina d'Oro.

== History ==
Montagnola is first mentioned in 1226, as Montegnola.

The merger of several formerly separate properties of the monastery of S. Abbondio in Como in 1535, led to the establishment of the Concilium Sancti Abundii which covered not only Gentilino but the village of Montagnola with the hamlets of Viglio, Orino, Arasio, Certenago, Poporino, Barca and Scairolo. An inventory of the monastery mentioned the presence of a fortress at Arasio.

Montagnola belongs to the parish of S. Abbondio at Gentilino. The chapels in S. Silvestro in Arasio and SS Nazaro in Celso were first mentioned in 1270 and 1442 respectively.

The local economy was based on agriculture as well as emigration of architects and builders from the Gilardi, Lucchini, Berra and Camuzzi families into various European countries, especially Russia. Several of these builders were able to create major works in these foreign cities and rise to great fame. The pleasant climate and attractive location of the village attracted many illustrious personalities from abroad including the writer Hermann Hesse. A museum to the writer opened in 1997. From 1923 to 1927 it was the seat of the prestigious Officina Bodoni, the printing shop of Hans (later Giovanni) Mardersteig. Since 1956, the village has been home to an international school, The American School In Switzerland, which, in 2014, has about 700 students of various nationalities. Because of its proximity to Lugano, Montagnola is now a kind of residential suburb of the city.

== Location ==
Aerial view (1950)

The former municipality stretched over the central portion of the Collina d'Oro valley from the Bay of Agno to Pian Scairolo, and included a number of villages.

The community includes a communal pre-primary school and a communal primary school. The American School In Switzerland is located in Montagnola.

The La Biblioteca comunale di Collina d'Oro is located in Montagnola, in proximity to the communal school. The library opened in 1990.

== Historic population ==
The historical population is given in the following chart:
