= Lago di Muzzano =

Lake in Ticino, Switzerland

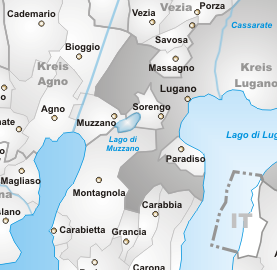

- Location within Canton of Ticino Location within Switzerland Location within Alps
- Interactive map of Lago di Muzzano
- Location: Ticino
- Coordinates: 45°59′50″N 8°55′41″E
- Basin countries: Switzerland
- Surface area: 23 ha (57 acres)
- Max. depth: 4 m (13 ft)
- Surface elevation: 337 m (1,106 ft)

Lago di Muzzano is a lake in Ticino, Switzerland. It is bordered by the municipalities of Sorengo, Muzzano and Collina d'Oro. Its surface area is 23 ha (57 acres). It drains into Lake Lugano.
