= Carabietta =

- Former municipality
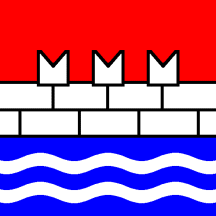
- Flag Coat of arms
- Location of Carabietta
- Location within Switzerland Location within Canton of Ticino
- Coordinates: 45°58′N 8°54′E
- Country: Switzerland
- Canton: Ticino
- District: Lugano

Area
  - Total: 0.46 km^{2} (0.18 sq mi)
- Elevation: 298 m (978 ft)

Population (December 2004)
  - Total: 116
  - Density: 250/km^{2} (650/sq mi)
- Time zone: UTC+01:00 (CET)
  - Summer (DST): UTC+02:00 (CEST)
- Postal code: 6919
- SFOS number: 5169
- ISO 3166 code: CH-TI
- Surrounded by: Caslano, Collina d'Oro, Lugano, Magliaso
- Website: SFSO statistics

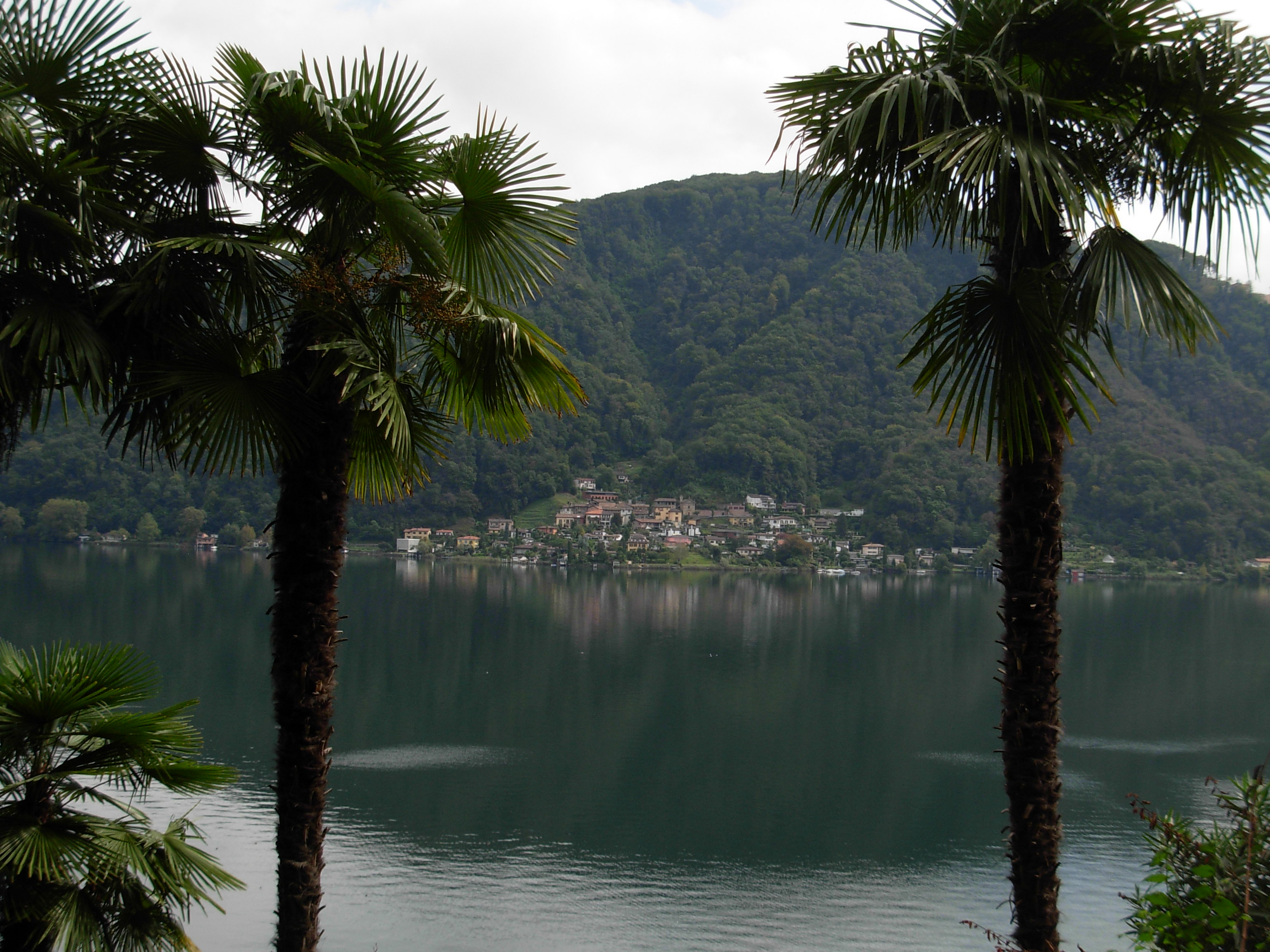
Carabietta seen from Caslano

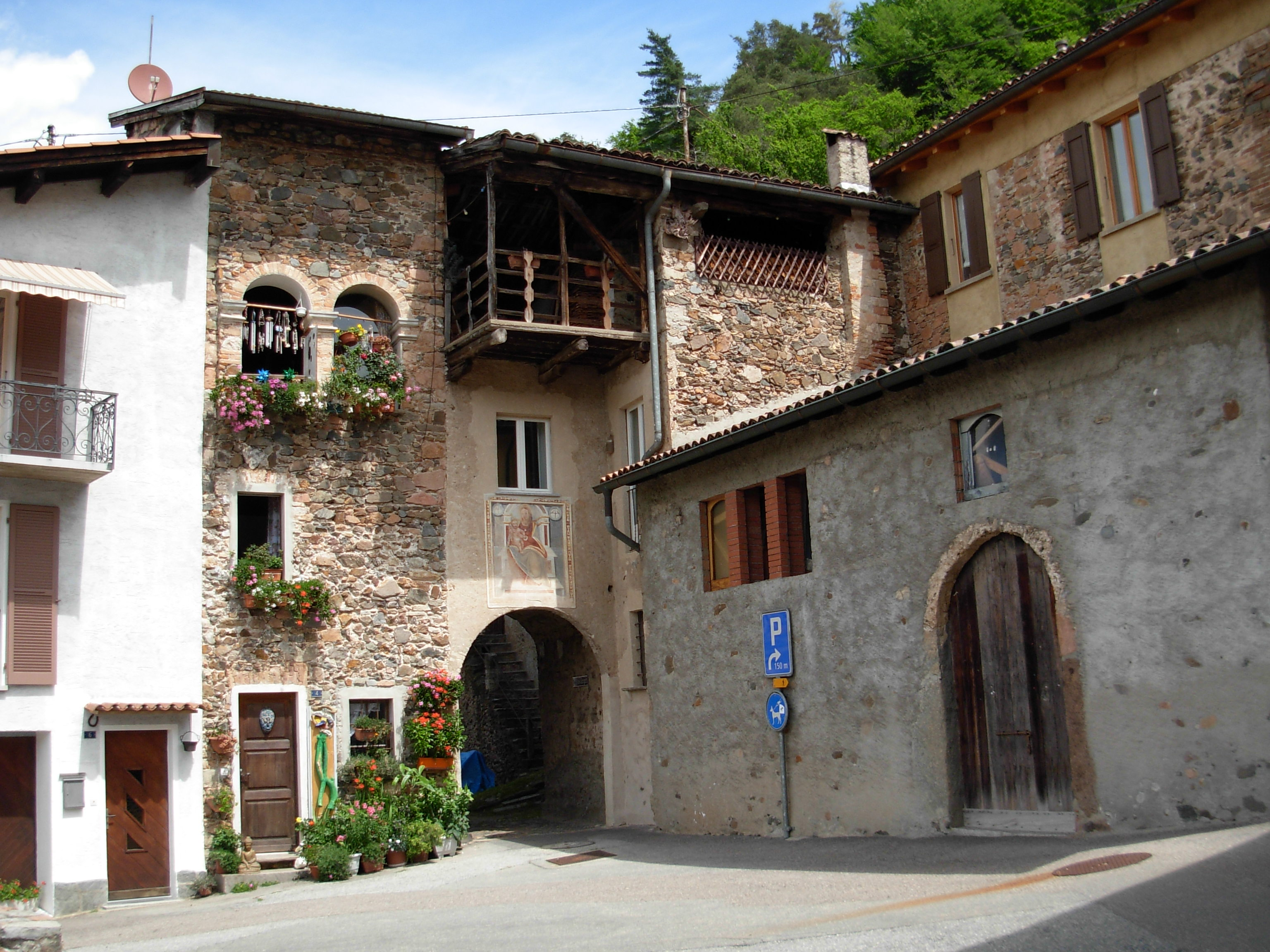
In the center of Carabietta

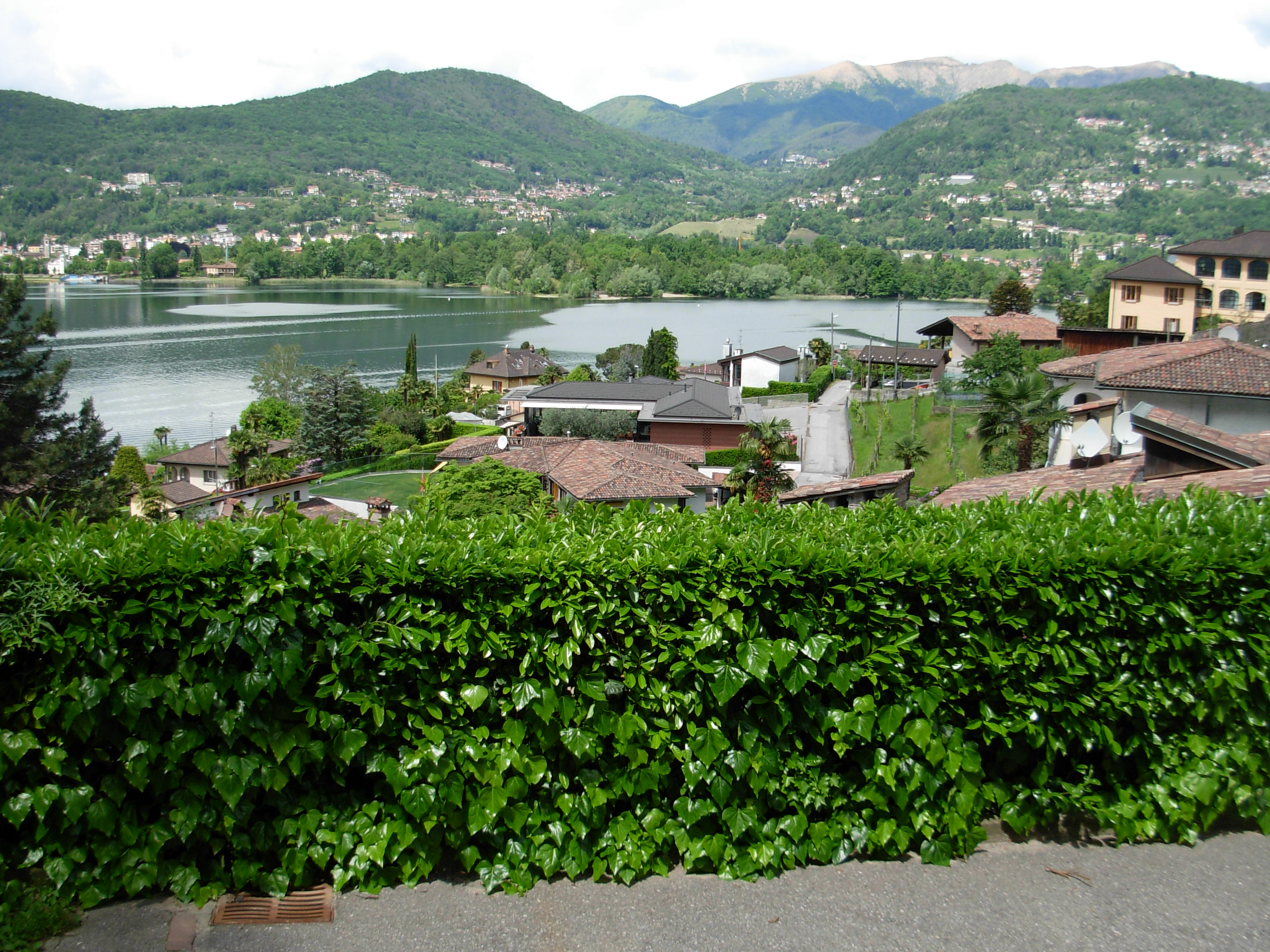
A part of the village and the lake of Lugano

Carabietta is a former municipality in the district of Lugano in the canton of Ticino in Switzerland. On 1 April 2012, it was incorporated into the municipality of Collina d'Oro.

== History ==
Carabietta is first mentioned in 1335 as Carabio. In 1375 it was mentioned as La Carabieta.

At the end of the 14th century it belonged to the Pieve of Agno, and in the 15th to 16th century to the Pieve of Lugano. It eventually became a dependent of the parish church of Morcote. Between 1803 and 1816, Carabietta belonged to the political municipality of Morcote. During the Middle Ages (documented first in 1355) and under the Swiss Confederation (reconfirmed in 1664 and 1784), the village was granted the status as an imperial cassina or a village that was exempt from taxes.

The church of San Bernardo was built in 1634 and stands on the foundations of a late-medieval church.

The residents of the village supplemented their income from agriculture through money sent back by emigrants.

Carabietta is one of the smallest municipalities of Ticino. It is developing gradually into a small commuter town. It shares financial and school obligations with Barbengo and Grancia.

== Geography ==
Carabietta has an area, as of 1997, of 0.46 square kilometers (0.18 sq mi). Of this area, 0.06 km^{2} (0.023 sq mi) or 13.0% is used for agricultural purposes, while 0.34 km^{2} (0.13 sq mi) or 73.9% is forested. Of the rest of the land, 0.08 km^{2} (20 acres) or 17.4% is settled (buildings or roads).

Of the built-up area, housing and buildings made up 13.0% and transportation infrastructure made up 4.3%. Out of the forested land, all of the forested land area is covered with heavy forests. Of the agricultural land, all of it is used for alpine pastures.

The municipality is located in the Lugano district, on the Agno arm of Lake Lugano.

== Coat of arms ==
The blazon of the municipal coat of arms is Gules, a wall throughout argent masoned sable embattled with three fishtail merlons of the second, on a base azure two bars wavy of the same.

== Demographics ==
Carabietta had a population (as of December 2020) of 113. As of 2008, 15.5% of the population are resident foreign nationals. Over the last 10 years (1997–2007) the population has changed at a rate of 22.4%.

Most of the population (as of 2000) speaks Italian (72.0%), with German being second most common (17.0%) and English being third (5.0%). Of the Swiss national languages (as of 2000), 17 speak German, 4 people speak French, 72 people speak Italian. The remainder (7 people) speak another language.

As of 2008, the gender distribution of the population was 45.0% male and 55.0% female. The population was made up of 42 Swiss men (35.0% of the population), and 12 (10.0%) non-Swiss men. There were 54 Swiss women (45.0%), and 12 (10.0%) non-Swiss women.

In 2008 there was 1 death of a Swiss citizen and 1 non-Swiss citizen death. Ignoring immigration and emigration, the population of Swiss citizens decreased by 1 while the foreign population decreased by 1. There were 2 non-Swiss men and 1 non-Swiss woman who immigrated from another country to Switzerland. The total Swiss population change in 2008 (from all sources, including moves across municipal borders) was a decrease of 5 and the non-Swiss population change was an increase of 1 people. This represents a population growth rate of -3.3%.

The age distribution, as of 2009, in Carabietta is; 4 children or 3.3% of the population are between 0 and 9 years old and 19 teenagers or 15.8% are between 10 and 19. Of the adult population, 9 people or 7.5% of the population are between 20 and 29 years old. 6 people or 5.0% are between 30 and 39, 35 people or 29.2% are between 40 and 49, and 20 people or 16.7% are between 50 and 59. The senior population distribution is 7 people or 5.8% of the population are between 60 and 69 years old, 7 people or 5.8% are between 70 and 79, there are 13 people or 10.8% who are over 80.

The vacancy rate for the municipality, in 2008, was 0%. In 2000 there were 89 apartments in the municipality. The most common apartment size was the 5 room apartment of which there were 32. There were 1 single room apartments and 32 apartments with five or more rooms. Of these apartments, a total of 44 apartments (49.4% of the total) were permanently occupied, while 44 apartments (49.4%) were seasonally occupied and 1 apartment (1.1%) was empty. As of 2007, the construction rate of new housing units was 0 new units per 1000 residents.

The historical population is given in the following chart:

== Politics ==
In the 2007 federal election the most popular party was the FDP which received 63.59% of the vote. The next three most popular parties were the CVP (11.52%), the SP (9.22%) and the Ticino League (6.68%). In the federal election, a total of 57 votes were cast, and the voter turnout was 73.1%.

In the 2007 Gran Consiglio election, there were a total of 76 registered voters in Carabietta, of which 58 or 76.3% voted. The most popular party was the PLRT which received 36 or 62.1% of the vote. The next three most popular parties were; the SSI (with 13 or 22.4%), the PS (with 6 or 10.3%) and the PPD+GenGiova (with 2 or 3.4%).

In the 2007 Consiglio di Stato election, The most popular party was the PLRT which received 34 or 58.6% of the vote. The next three most popular parties were; the SSI (with 11 or 19.0%), the PS (with 6 or 10.3%) and the LEGA (with 5 or 8.6%).

== Economy ==
As of 2007, Carabietta had an unemployment rate of 5.21%. As of 2005, there were 3 people were employed in the tertiary sector, with 3 businesses in this sector. There were 38 residents of the municipality who were employed in some capacity, of which females made up 28.9% of the workforce.

In 2000, there were 5 workers who commuted into the municipality and 31 workers who commuted away. The municipality is a net exporter of workers, with about 6.2 workers leaving the municipality for every one entering. Of the working population, 5.3% used public transportation to get to work, and 68.4% used a private car.

== Religion ==
From the 2000 census, 71 or 71.0% were Roman Catholic, while 13 or 13.0% belonged to the Swiss Reformed Church. There are 15 individuals (or about 15.00% of the population) who belong to another church (not listed on the census), and 1 individuals (or about 1.00% of the population) did not answer the question.

== Education ==
The entire Swiss population is generally well educated. In Carabietta about 81.7% of the population (between age 25 and 64) have completed either non-mandatory upper secondary education or additional higher education (either University or a Fachhochschule).

In Carabietta there were a total of 24 students (as of 2009). The Ticino education system provides up to three years of non-mandatory kindergarten and in Carabietta there were children in kindergarten. The primary school program lasts for five years. In the municipality, 3 students attended the standard primary schools. In the lower secondary school system, students either attend a two-year middle school followed by a two-year pre-apprenticeship or they attend a four-year program to prepare for higher education. There were 14 students in the two-year middle school, while 2 students were in the four-year advanced program.

The upper secondary school includes several options, but at the end of the upper secondary program, a student will be prepared to enter a trade or to continue on to a university or college. In Ticino, vocational students may either attend school while working on their internship or apprenticeship (which takes three or four years) or may attend school followed by an internship or apprenticeship (which takes one year as a full-time student or one and a half to two years as a part-time student). There was 1 vocational student who was attending school full-time and 3 who attend part-time.

The professional program lasts three years and prepares a student for a job in engineering, nursing, computer science, business, tourism and similar fields. There was 1 student in the professional program.

As of 2000, there were 9 students from Carabietta who attended schools outside the municipality.
