= Collina d'Oro =

- Municipality
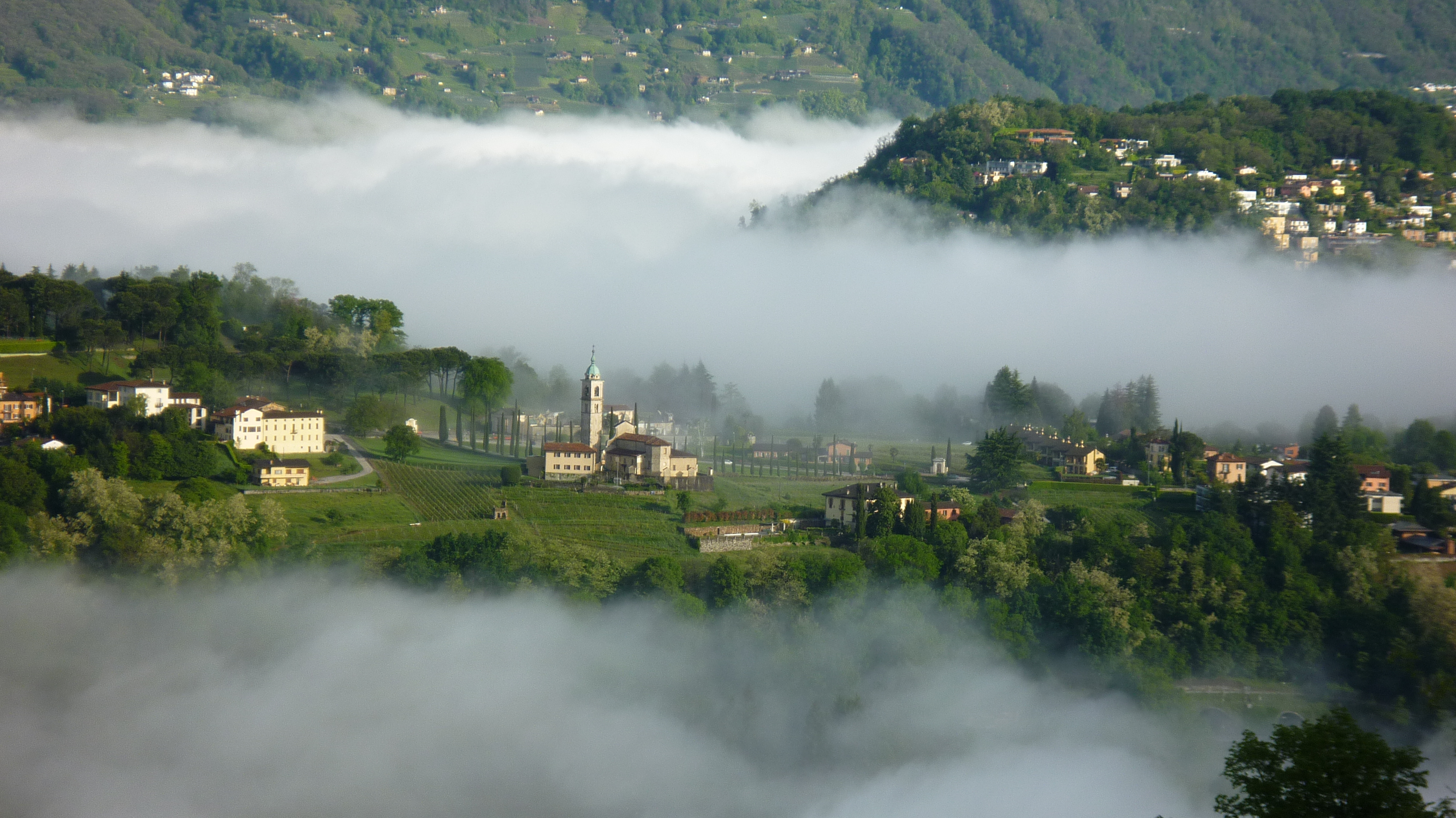

- Flag Coat of arms
- Location of Collina d'Oro
- Location within Switzerland Location within Canton of Ticino
- Coordinates: 45°59′N 8°55′E
- Country: Switzerland
- Canton: Ticino
- District: Lugano

Government
  - Mayor: Sindaco

Area
  - Total: 6.49 km^{2} (2.51 sq mi)
- Elevation: 469 m (1,539 ft)

Population (December 2004)
  - Total: 4,169
  - Density: 642/km^{2} (1,660/sq mi)
- Time zone: UTC+01:00 (CET)
  - Summer (DST): UTC+02:00 (CEST)
- Postal code: 6926
- SFOS number: 5236
- ISO 3166 code: CH-TI
- Localities: Agra, Carabietta, Gentilino, Montagnola
- Surrounded by: Agno, Grancia, Lugano, Magliaso, Muzzano, Sorengo
- Website: www.collinadoro.com

Collina d'Oro (English: Golden Hill) is a municipality in the district of Lugano in the canton of Ticino in Switzerland. It was formed from the 2004 union of the villages of Agra, Gentilino, and Montagnola. On 1 April 2012, it incorporated the formerly independent municipality of Carabietta.

== History ==
Gentilino is first mentioned in 1210 as Gentarino. Montagnola is first mentioned in 1226 as Montegnola.

=== Agra ===
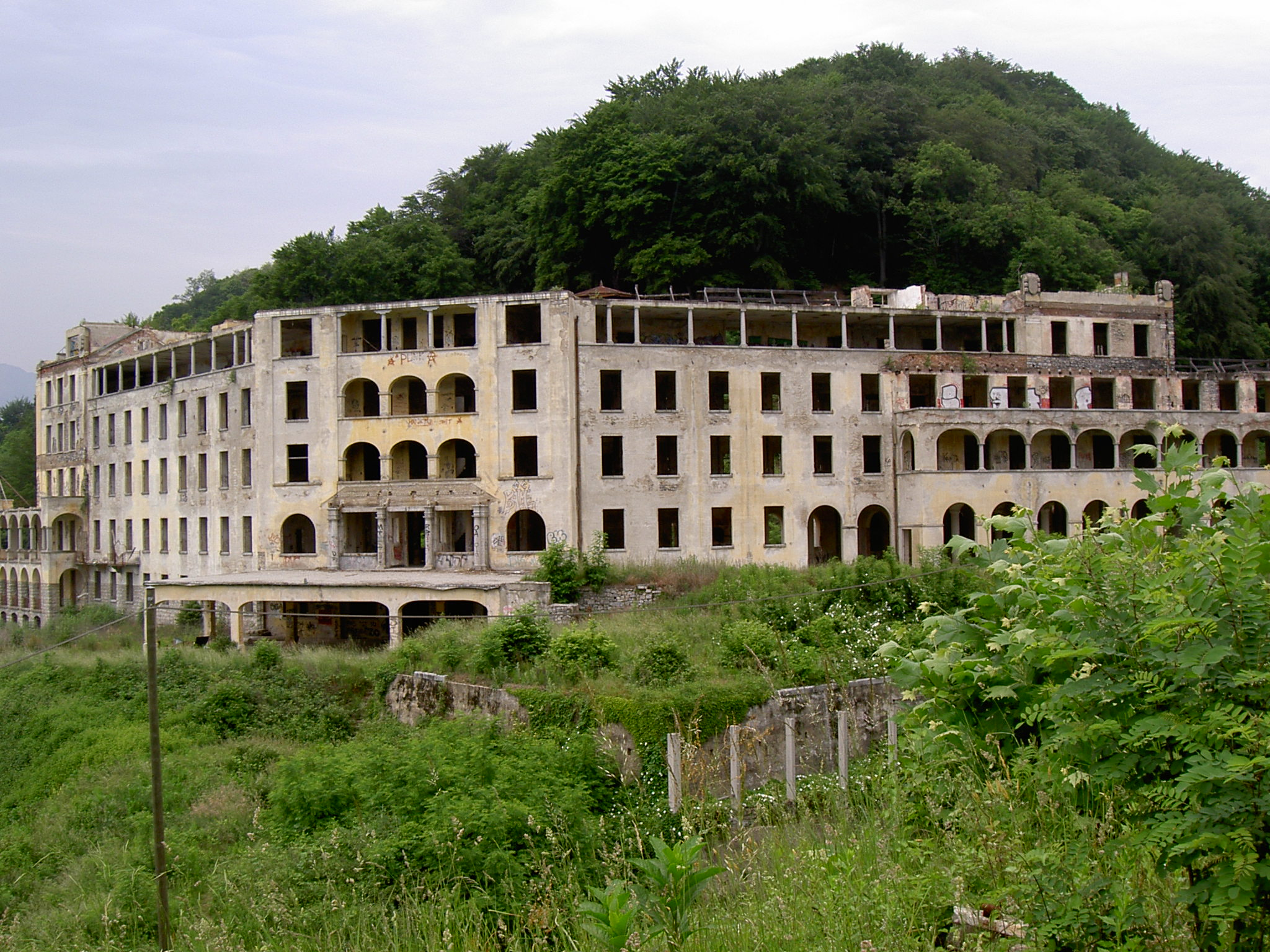
Ruins of the regional sanatorium

The hamlet of Bigogno, which is part of Agra, is first mentioned in 1270 in an inventory of the lands of the monastery of S. Abbondio in Como in the Valle di Lugano. The inventory of Como Cathedral (1298) mentions their allodial titles and episcopal loans in Agra as well as possessions of the Disentis Abbey. The same document also mentions the church of S. Tommaso in Agra. The church initially belonged to the parish of S. Pietro in Pambio and then became an under-parish in 1591. The Chapel of S. Assunta in Bigogno was completed before 1609. In the statutes of Como from 1335, the Concilium or Vicinanza of Agra and Premona or Barbengo is first mentioned.

In addition to agriculture, the village was once famous for training and sending artisans to Russia along with other European nations. In 1912 a regional sanatorium opened in the village. It was a residence to for many, especially German-speaking, notables and intellectuals. They published the monthly magazine Die Terrasse (The Terrace) from the sanatorium. It was closed in 1969 and fell into disrepair.

=== Gentilino ===
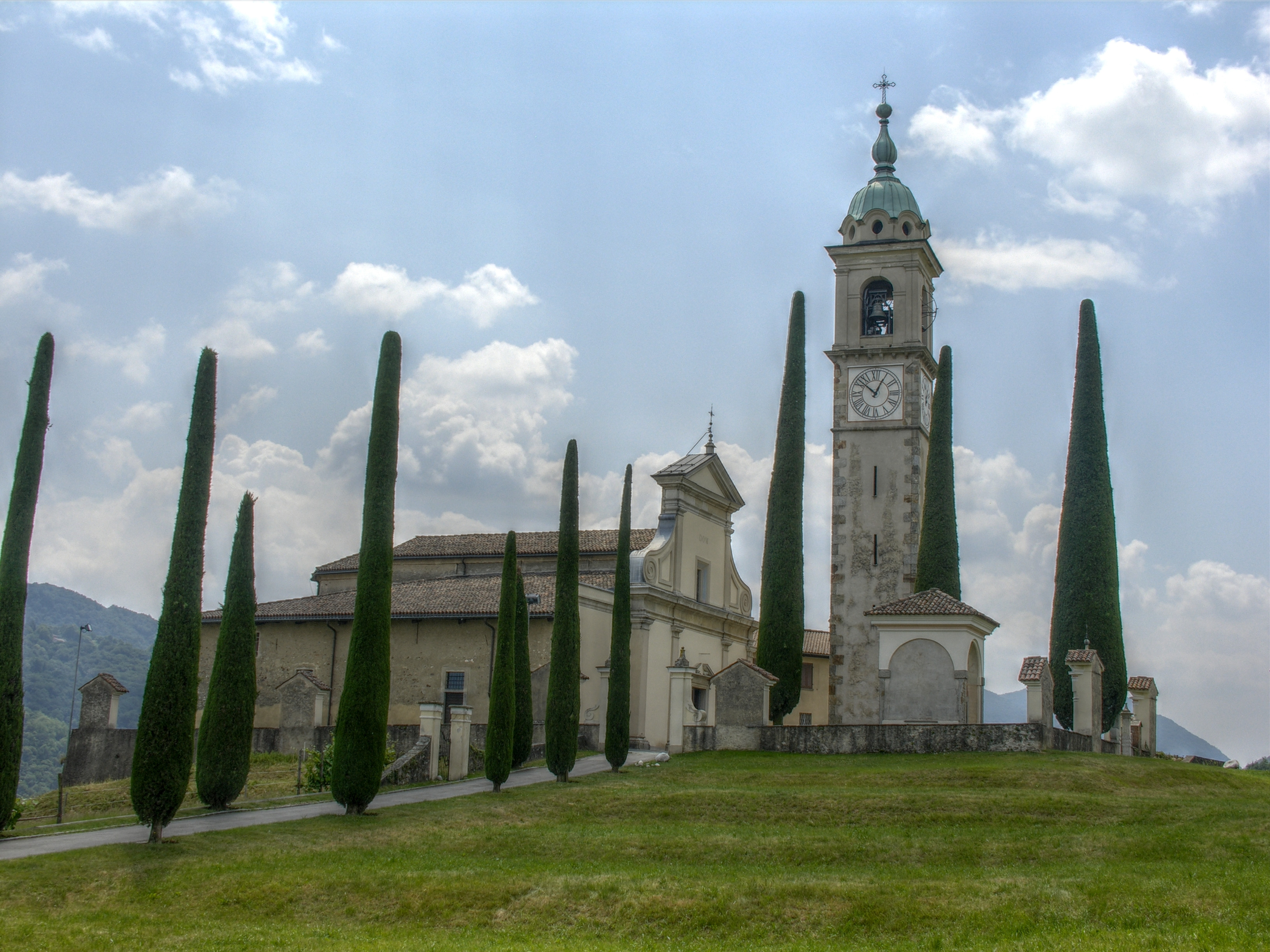
Church of S. Abbondio

In the Early Middle Ages Gentilino belonged to the royal court of Agnuzzo, which was donated in 818 by Emperor Louis the Pious to the clergy of Como. During the 11th century it belonged to the monastery of S. Abbondio in Como. The union of the monastic estates in 1335 probably led to the creation of the Concilium Sancti Abundii which included Gentilino and Viglio as well as Montagnola and the surrounding villages. In the early 18th century, the village wanted to buy the monastery's rights to the village. However, this triggered a long-running dispute, in which the Canton was eventually involved.

It is believed that the church of S. Abbondio was the center of a medieval parish, which became a sub-parish in the 11th century. However, the first written record of the church dates from 1140. The current appearance is due to an enlargement in the 17th century.

In the past centuries, the population lived mainly from agriculture, but there were also a large exodus of builders (known as Maestranze). Recently, it has grown into a bedroom community for the nearby city of Lugano.

=== Montagnola ===
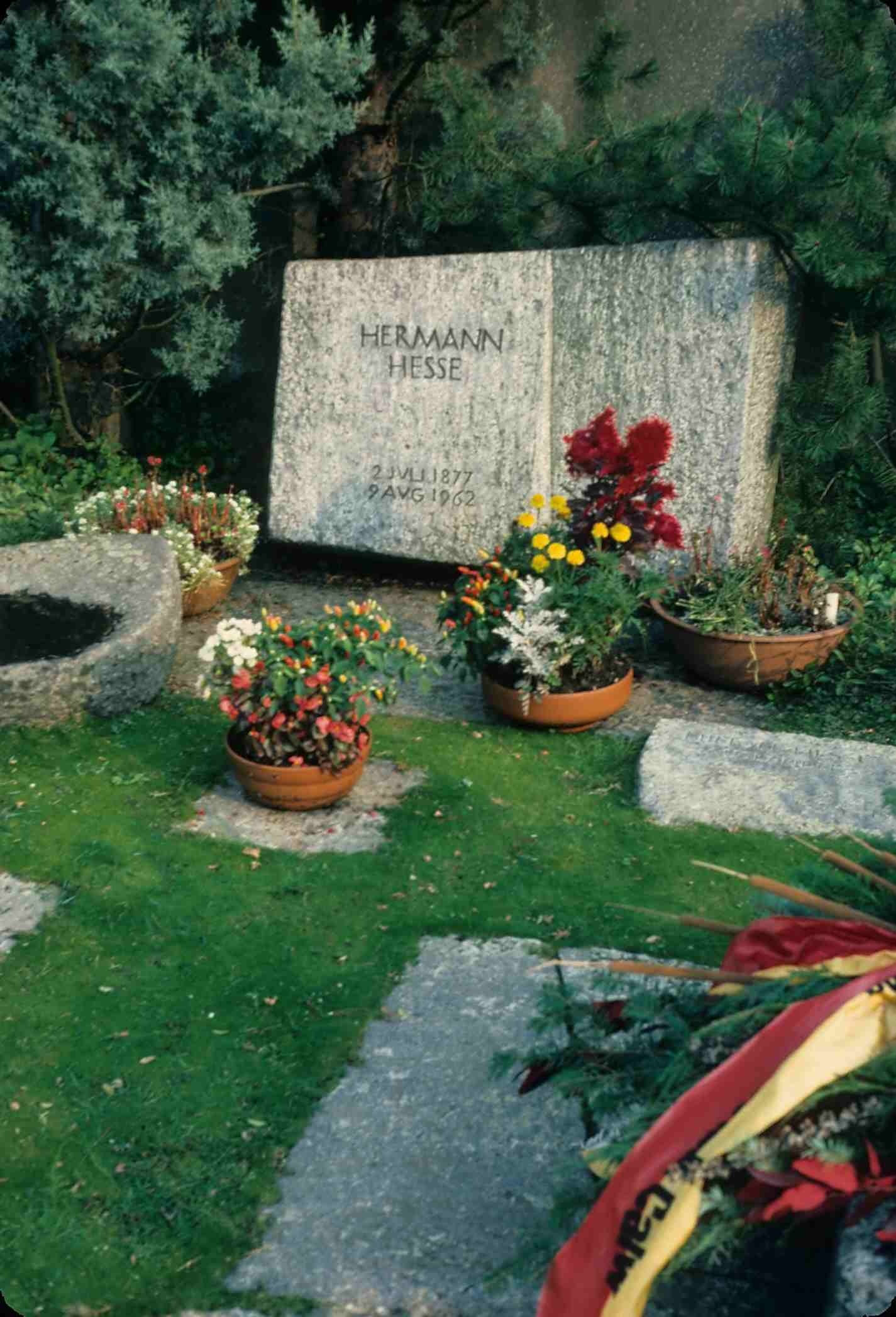
Hermann Hesse's Grave in Montagnola

The merger of several formerly separate properties of the monastery of S. Abbondio in Como in 1535, led to the establishment of the Concilium Sancti Abundii which covered not only Gentilino but the village of Montagnola with the hamlets of Vigilio, Orino, Arasio, Certenago, Poprino, Barca and Scairolo. An inventory of the monastery mentioned the presence of a fortress at Arasio.

Montagnola belongs to the parish of S. Abbondio at Gentilino. The chapels in S. Silvestro in Arasio and SS Nazaro in Celso were first mentioned in 1270 and 1442 respectively.

The local economy was based on agriculture as well as emigration of architects and builders from the Gilardi, Lucchini, Berra and Camuzzi families into various European countries, especially Russia. Several of these builders were able to create major works in these foreign cities and rise to great fame. The pleasant climate and attractive location of the village attracted many illustrious personalities from abroad, including the writer Hermann Hesse. A museum to the writer opened in 1997. Between 1923 and 1927 it was the seat of the prestigious Officina Bodoni, the printing shop of Hans (later Giovanni) Mardersteig. Since 1956, Montagnola is home to an international school, The American School In Switzerland. Due to its proximity to Lugano, Montagnola is now a kind of residential suburb of the city.

=== Carabietta ===
Carabietta is first mentioned in 1335 as Carabio. In 1375 it was mentioned as La Carabieta.

At the end of the 14th century, it belonged to the Pieve of Agno, and in the 15th and 16th centuries to the Pieve of Lugano. It eventually became a dependent of the parish church of Morcote. Between 1803 and 1816, Carabietta belonged to the political municipality of Morcote. During the Middle Ages (documented first in 1355) and under the Swiss Confederation (reconfirmed in 1664 and 1784), the village was granted the status as an imperial cassina or a village that was exempt from taxes.

The church of San Bernardo was built in 1634, and stands on the foundations of a late-medieval church.

The residents of the village supplemented their income from agriculture through money sent back by emigrants.

Carabietta was one of the smallest municipalities of Ticino. It was developing gradually into a small commuter town.

== Geography ==
Aerial view by Walter Mittelholzer (1919)

Collina d'Oro has an area, as of 1997, of 6.15 km^{2} (2.37 mi^{2}). Of this area, 11.8% is used for agricultural purposes, while 51.5% is forested. Of the rest of the land, or 36.2% is settled (buildings or roads) and 0.05 km^{2} (12 acres) or 0.5% is unproductive land.

Lago di Muzzano is shared with the neighboring municipalities.

The village of Agra is located at an elevation of 570 m (1,870 ft) at the foot of Monte Crocione. Until the merger, the village of Gentilino included the north side of the Collina d'Oro valley, and the settlement of Viglio. The former municipality of Montagnola stretched over the central portion of the Collina d'Oro valley from the Bay of Agno to Pian Scairolo, and included a number of villages. Carabietta was located in the Lugano district, on the Agno arm of Lake Lugano.

== Demographics ==
Collina d'Oro has a population (as of December 2020) of 4,604. As of 2008, 28.5% of the population are resident foreign nationals. Over the last 10 years (1997–2007) the population has changed at a rate of 21.1%.

Most of the population (as of 2000) speaks Italian (74.9%), with German being second most common (10.6%) and English being third (5.0%).

As of 2008, the gender distribution of the population was 47.9% male and 52.1% female. The population was made up of 1,457 Swiss men (32.5% of the population), and 694 (15.5%) non-Swiss men. There were 1,677 Swiss women (37.4%), and 658 (14.7%) non-Swiss women.

In 2008 there were 29 live births to Swiss citizens and 8 births to non-Swiss citizens, and in same time span there were 26 deaths of Swiss citizens and 3 non-Swiss citizen deaths. Ignoring immigration and emigration, the population of Swiss citizens increased by 3 while the foreign population increased by 5. There were 3 Swiss men who immigrated back to Switzerland and 1 Swiss woman who emigrated from Switzerland. At the same time, there were 31 non-Swiss men and 31 non-Swiss women who immigrated from another country to Switzerland. The total Swiss population change in 2008 (from all sources, including moves across municipal borders) was an increase of 10 and the non-Swiss population change was an increase of 26 people. This represents a population growth rate of 0.8%.

The age distribution, as of 2009, in Collina d'Oro is; 429 children or 9.6% of the population are between 0 and 9 years old and 714 teenagers or 15.9% are between 10 and 19. Of the adult population, 368 people or 8.2% of the population are between 20 and 29 years old. 564 people or 12.6% are between 30 and 39, 714 people or 15.9% are between 40 and 49, and 613 people or 13.7% are between 50 and 59. The senior population distribution is 519 people or 11.6% of the population are between 60 and 69 years old, 341 people or 7.6% are between 70 and 79, there are 224 people or 5.0% who are over 80.

== Historic Population ==
The historical population is given in the following chart:

== Politics ==
In the 2007 federal election the most popular party was the FDP which received 37.8% of the vote. The next three most popular parties were the CVP (17.98%), the Ticino League (13.71%) and the SVP (12.98%). In the federal election, a total of 1,369 votes were cast, and the voter turnout was 51.3%.

In the 2007 Gran Consiglio election, there were a total of 2,661 registered voters in Collina d'Oro, of which 1,727 or 64.9% voted. 23 blank ballots and 3 null ballots were cast, leaving 1,701 valid ballots in the election. The most popular party was the PLRT which received 613 or 36.0% of the vote. The next three most popular parties were; the LEGA (with 276 or 16.2%), the SSI (with 258 or 15.2%) and the PPD+GenGiova (with 207 or 12.2%).

In the 2007 Consiglio di Stato election, 12 blank ballots and 8 null ballots were cast, leaving 1,706 valid ballots in the election. The most popular party was the PLRT which received 599 or 35.1% of the vote. The next three most popular parties were; the LEGA (with 370 or 21.7%), the SSI (with 221 or 13.0%) and the PS (with 214 or 12.5%).

== Education ==
In Collina d'Oro about 81% of the population (between age 25 and 64) have completed either non-mandatory upper secondary education or additional higher education (either University or a Fachhochschule).

In Collina d'Oro there were a total of 751 students (as of 2009). The Ticino education system provides up to three years of non-mandatory kindergarten and in Collina d'Oro there were 126 children in kindergarten. The primary school program lasts for five years and includes both a standard school and a special school. In the municipality, 334 students attended the standard primary schools and 5 students attended the special school. In the lower secondary school system, students either attend a two-year middle school followed by a two-year pre-apprenticeship or they attend a four-year program to prepare for higher education. There were 143 students in the two-year middle school and 2 in their pre-apprenticeship, while 90 students were in the four-year advanced program.

The upper secondary school includes several options, but at the end of the upper secondary program, a student will be prepared to enter a trade or to continue on to a university or college. In Ticino, vocational students may either attend school while working on their internship or apprenticeship (which takes three or four years) or may attend school followed by an internship or apprenticeship (which takes one year as a full-time student or one and a half to two years as a part-time student). There were 21 vocational students who were attending school full-time and 26 who attend part-time.

The professional program lasts three years and prepares a student for a job in engineering, nursing, computer science, business, tourism and similar fields. There were 4 students in the professional program.

=== Primary and secondary schools ===
The primary school is located in Montagnola, and there are pre-primary schools in both Montagnola and Gentilino.

The American School In Switzerland is located in Montagnola.

=== Public libraries ===
The La Biblioteca comunale di Collina d'Oro is located in Montagnola, in proximity to the communal school. The library opened in 1990.

== Economy ==
As of 2007, Collina d'Oro had an unemployment rate of 2.58%. As of 2005, there were 31 people employed in the primary economic sector and about 8 businesses involved in this sector. 703 people were employed in the secondary sector and there were 26 businesses in this sector. 1,016 people were employed in the tertiary sector, with 161 businesses in this sector. Of the working population, 8% used public transportation to get to work, and 65.6% used a private car.

As of 2009, there were 4 hotels in Collina d'Oro with a total of 40 rooms and 79 beds.

== Heritage sites of national significance ==
The Camuzzi House, Cimitero and Parish Church of S. Abbondio, with Ossuary and Via Crucis are listed as Swiss heritage site of national significance.

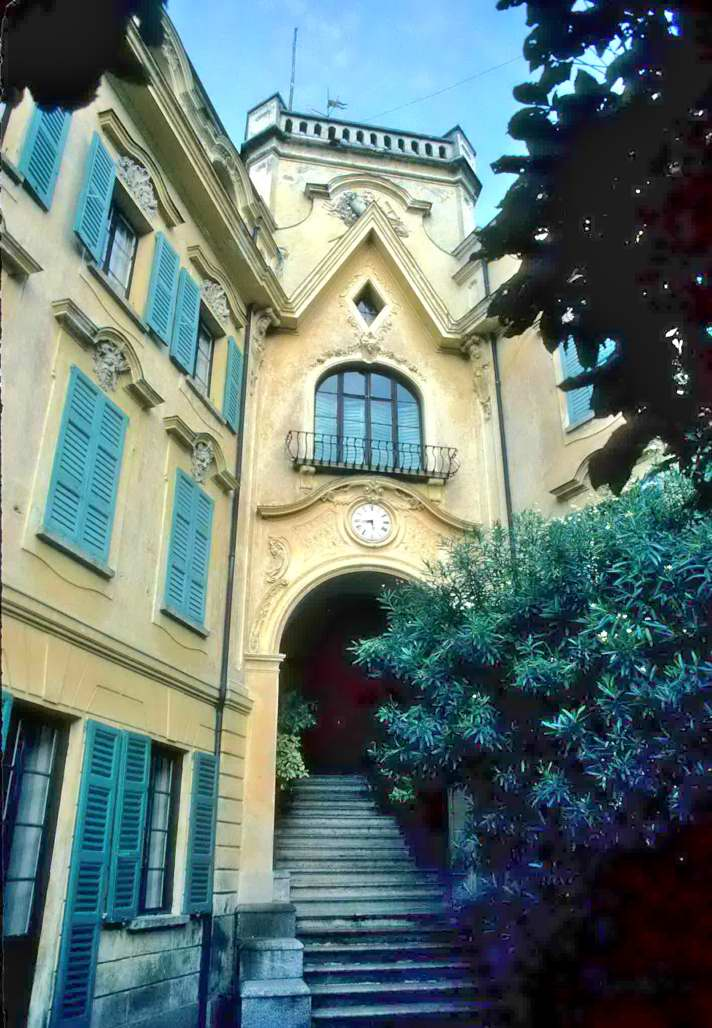
Camuzzi house

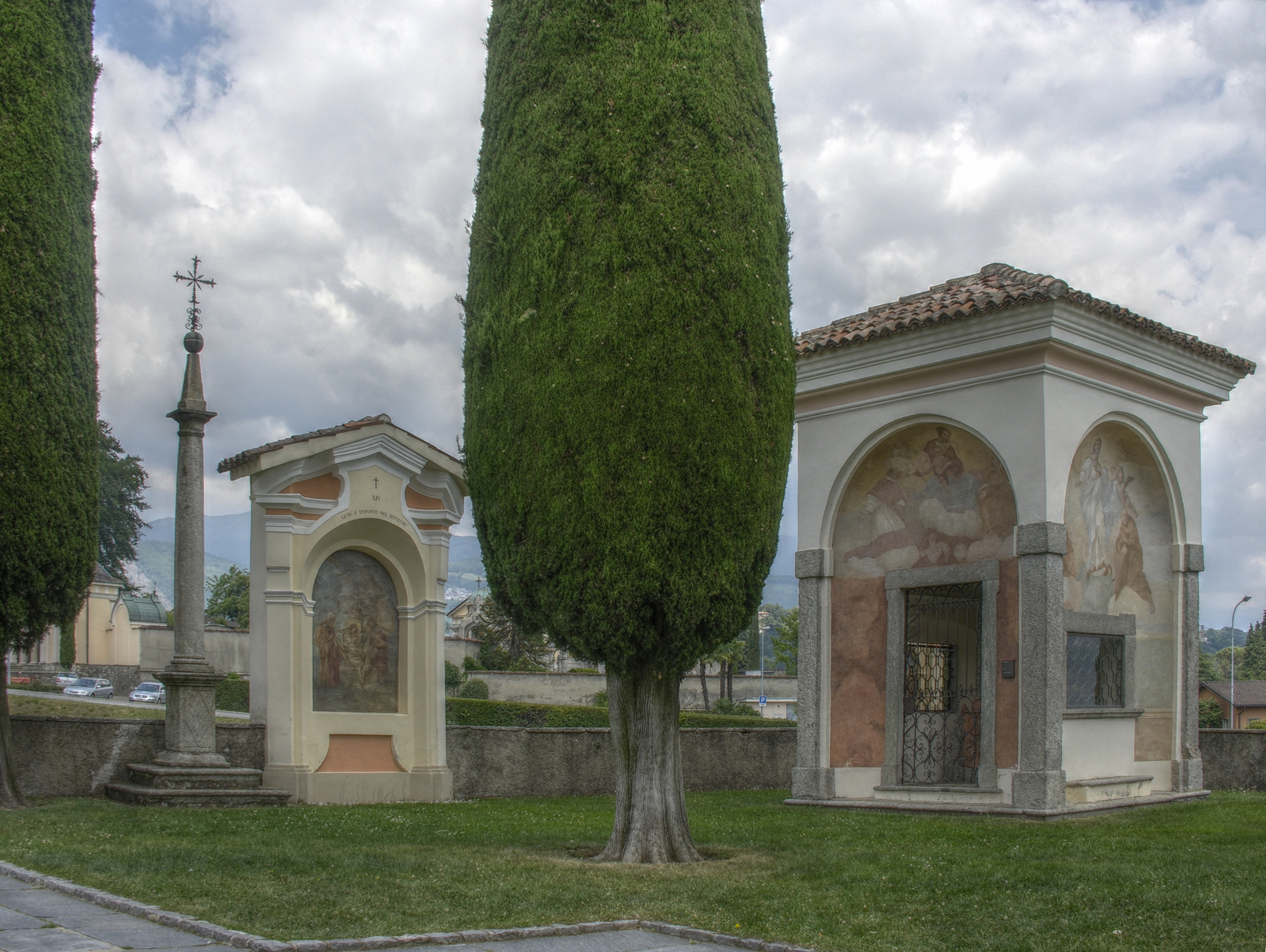
Sant'Abbondio Church, Ossuary and one painting of the Via Crucis

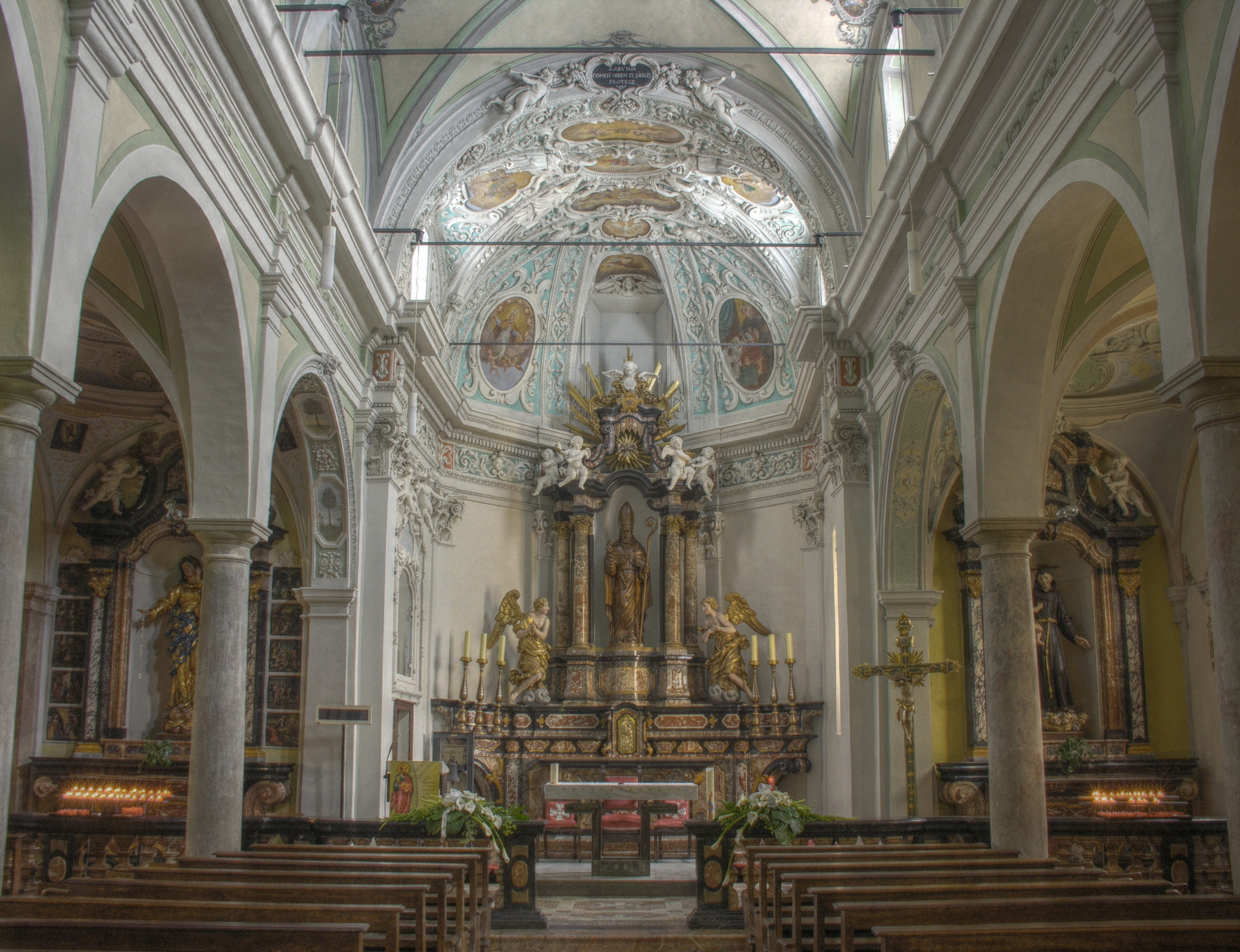
Interior of Sant'Abbondio Church

== Notable residents ==
Montagnola was the home for over thirty years of the writer and Nobel laureate Hermann Hesse until his death in 1962. He is buried in Gentilino's San Abbondio cemetery.

== Housing ==
As of 2000, there were 1,545 private households in the municipality, and an average of 2.3 persons per household. The vacancy rate for the municipality, in 2008, was 0.45%. As of 2007, the construction rate of new housing units was 3.6 new units per 1000 residents.

== Transport & Sport ==
The northern part of the municipality is served by Cappella-Agnuzzo station on the Lugano–Ponte Tresa railway. The station is served by regular trains, operating every 15 minutes during weekday daytime, and every half-hour at other times. Collina d'Oro is also served by buses of the Autopostale.

The city has 2 main sport facilities: Centro Ricreativo and Campo Campari both located in Gentilino. In Campo Campari plays the official football team of Collina D'oro
