= Barbengo =

- Quarter
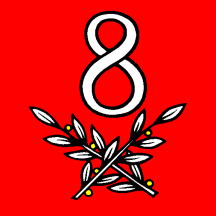
- Flag Coat of arms

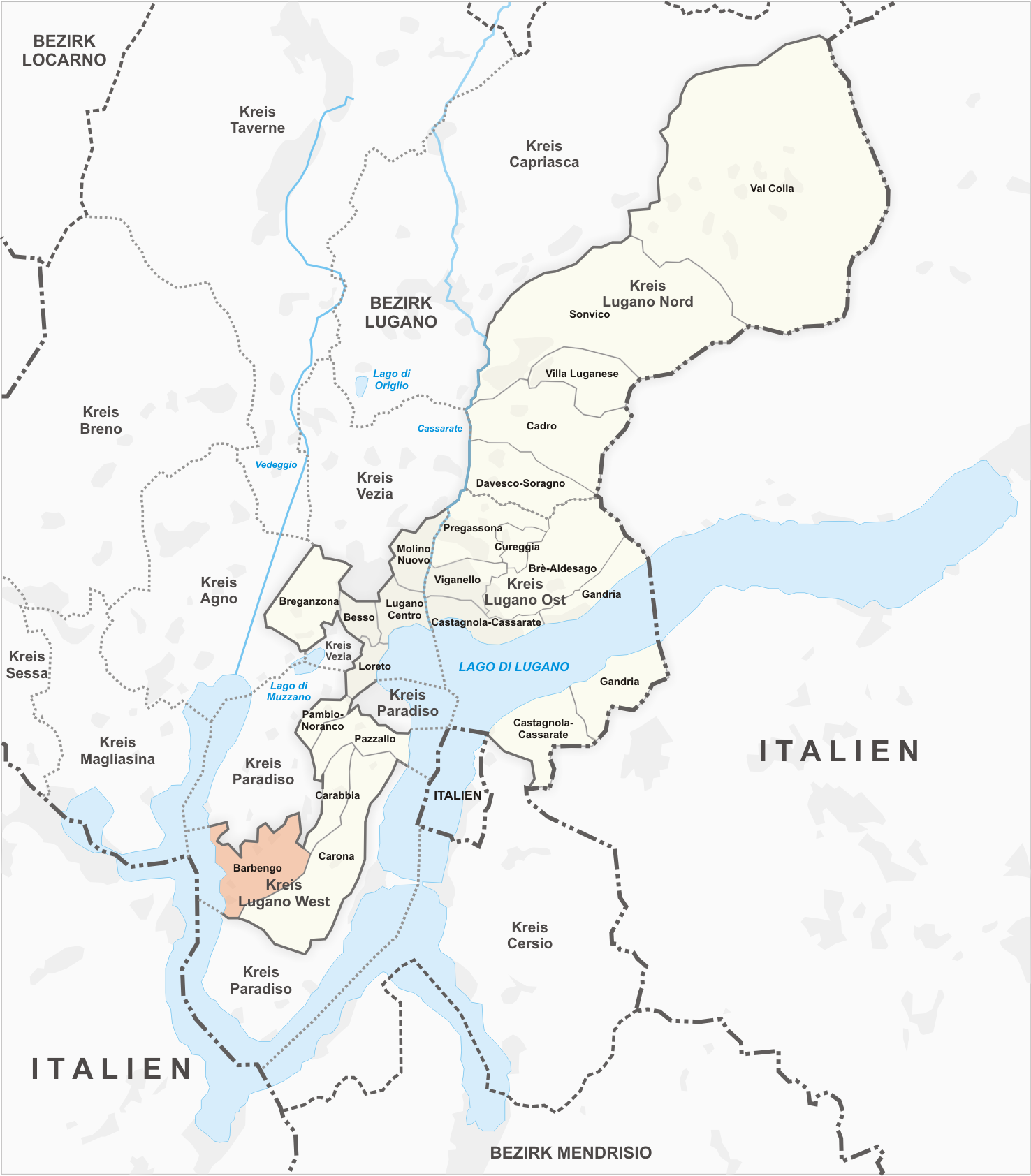
- Country: Switzerland
- Canton: Ticino
- District: Lugano
- City: Lugano

Area
  - Total: 2.65 km^{2} (1.02 sq mi)

Population (2012-12-31)
  - Total: 2,133
  - Density: 805/km^{2} (2,080/sq mi)

Barbengo is a quarter of the city of Lugano, Switzerland. It includes the settlements of Cadepiano, Campagnore, Casaccia, Cernesio, Garaverio and Figino. Barbengo was formerly a municipality of its own, having been incorporated into Lugano in 2008.

The population of Barbengo dropped by 3.9% between 2015 and 2020.
